= Hyundai Sonata =

Mid-size sedan produced by Hyundai

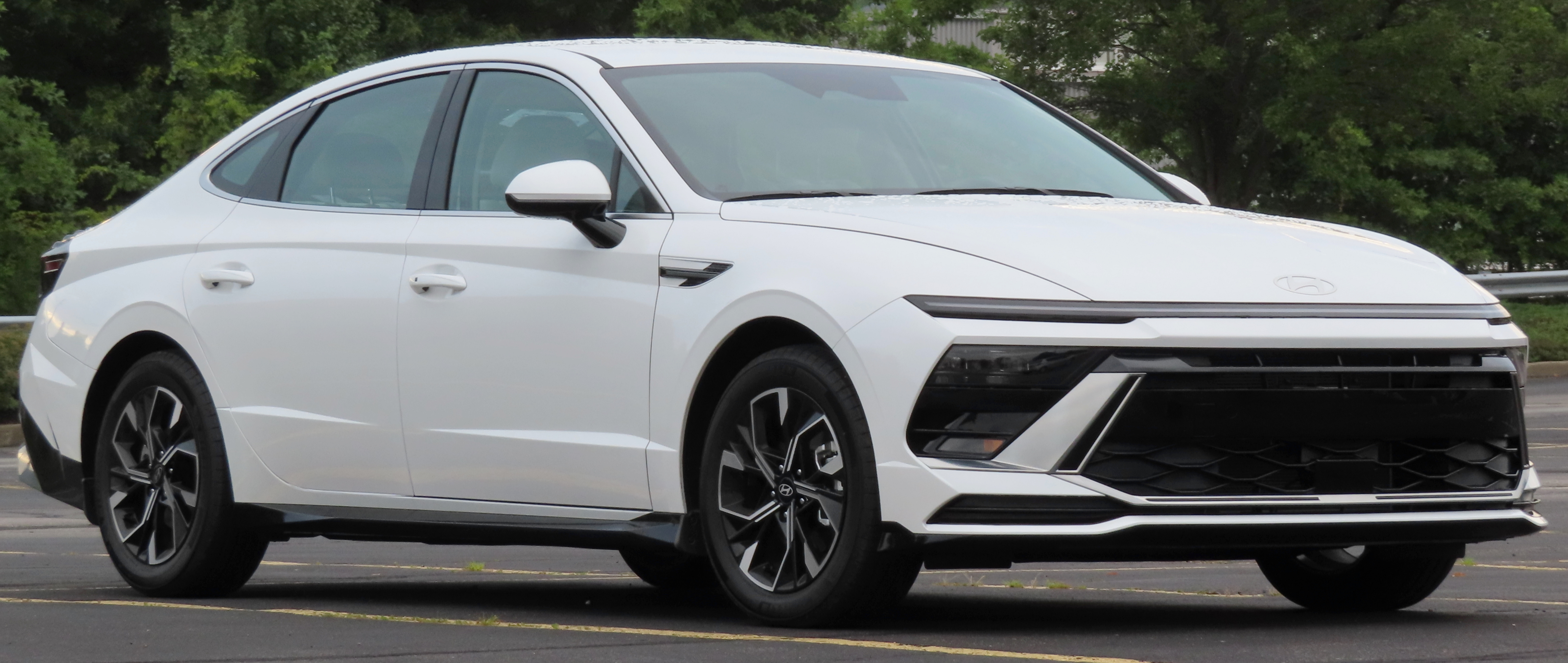
- 2024 Hyundai Sonata SEL (US)

Overview
- Manufacturer: Hyundai
- Production: 1985–present

Body and chassis
- Class: Mid-size car (D)
- Body style: 4-door sedan
- Layout: Front-engine, rear-wheel-drive (1985–1988); Front-engine, front-wheel-drive (1988–present); Front-engine, four-wheel-drive (2023–present)

Chronology
- Predecessor: Hyundai Stellar

The Hyundai Sonata (Korean: 현대 쏘나타) is a mid-size car that has been manufactured by Hyundai since 1985. The first generation Sonata, which was introduced in 1985 as a facelifted version of the Hyundai Stellar and was sold only briefly in South Korea. The second-generation model, introduced in 1988, was the first Sonata to be widely exported.

The eighth-generation Sonata (DN8), introduced in 2019 and facelifted in 2023, is the current generation. It is offered in various markets with gasoline, hybrid, and N Line variants, with specifications and powertrain availability varying by region.

The Sonata is currently produced in South Korea, China, and Pakistan. The nameplate was named after the musical term sonata. It was previously manufactured in the United States from 2005 until 2022, when production was discontinued at Hyundai Motor Manufacturing Alabama.

== First generation (Y1; 1985) ==
First generation
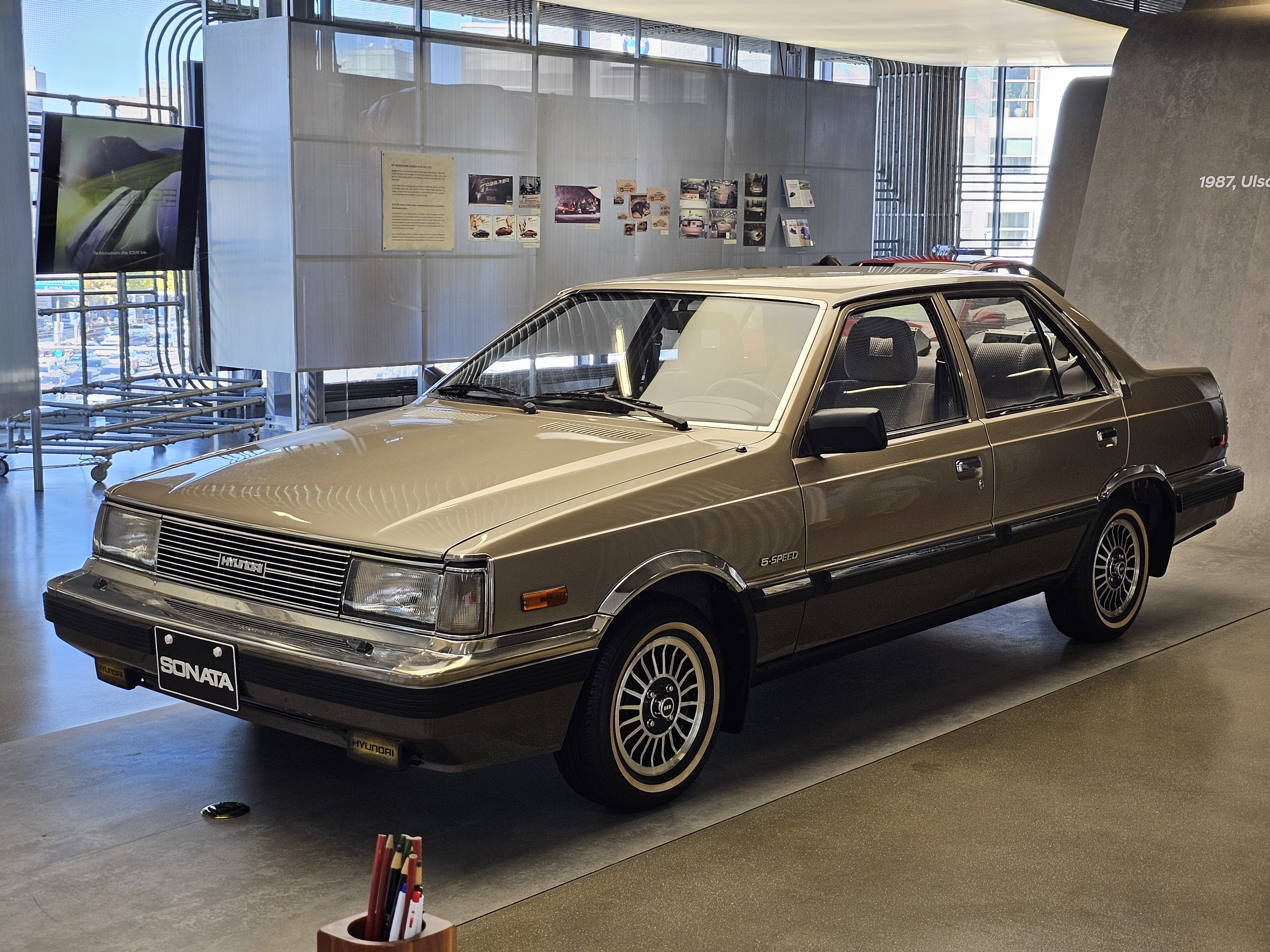

Overview
- Model code: Y1
- Production: 1985–1988
- Assembly: South Korea: Ulsan

Body and chassis
- Related: Hyundai Stellar

Powertrain
- Engine: 1.8 L G4BM I4; 2.0 L G4BT I4
- Transmission: 5-speed manual 4-speed automatic

Dimensions
- Wheelbase: 2,579 mm (101.5 in)
- Length: 4,578 mm (180.2 in)
- Width: 1,755 mm (69.1 in)
- Height: 1,380 mm (54.3 in)

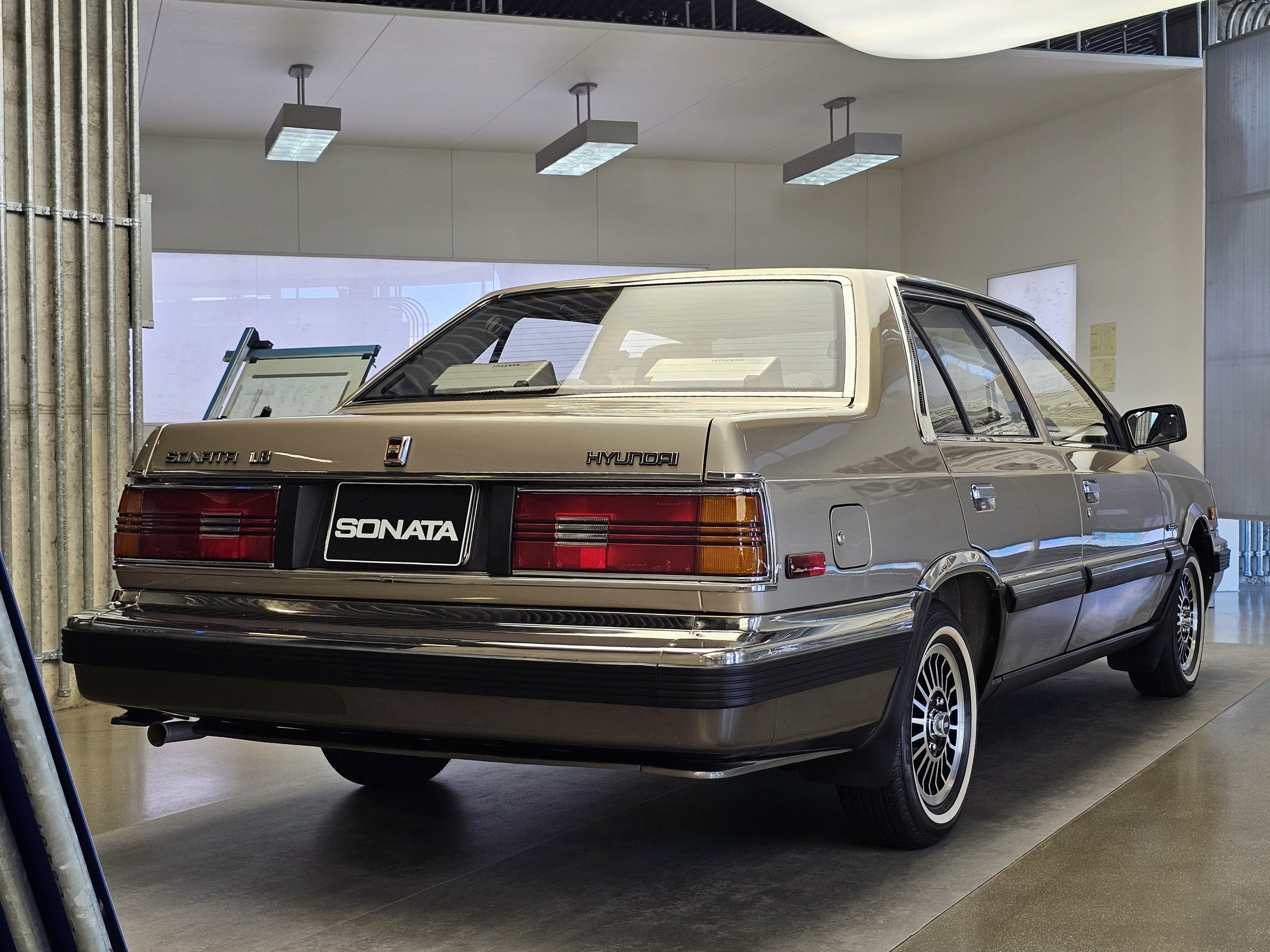
1987 Hyundai Sonata (South Korea)

The first Sonata was introduced to compete with the Daewoo Royale series and was a more luxurious version of the Stellar. It included cruise control, power seats, head lamp washers, power brakes, electric operated adjustable side mirrors and chrome bumper trims. The Sonata was available with two trim options in Korea: Luxury and Super (the latter only available with a 2.0-liter engine). In the domestic market Hyundai attempted to sell the Sonata as an executive car using catchphrases like "Luxury car for VIP"; however, as the Sonata was based on the Stellar without any major changes, it was seen by the public as no more than a luxury version of the Stellar. In 1987 Hyundai added two tone color schemes and a trip computer option, but sales soon went down and the car was discontinued in December of that year. The Sonata was sold only in the South Korean domestic market. The vehicle was unveiled in South Korea on 4 November 1985.

Engine choices included 1.6-liter Mitsubishi Saturn (only available outside the domestic market), 1.8- and 2.0-liter Mitsubishi Sirius inline-fours. The latter unit also found its way into the 1987 and later Stellar, and in MPI form the 1986 Hyundai Grandeur. The body was a largely unchanged Hyundai Stellar.

== Second generation (Y2; 1988) ==
Second generation
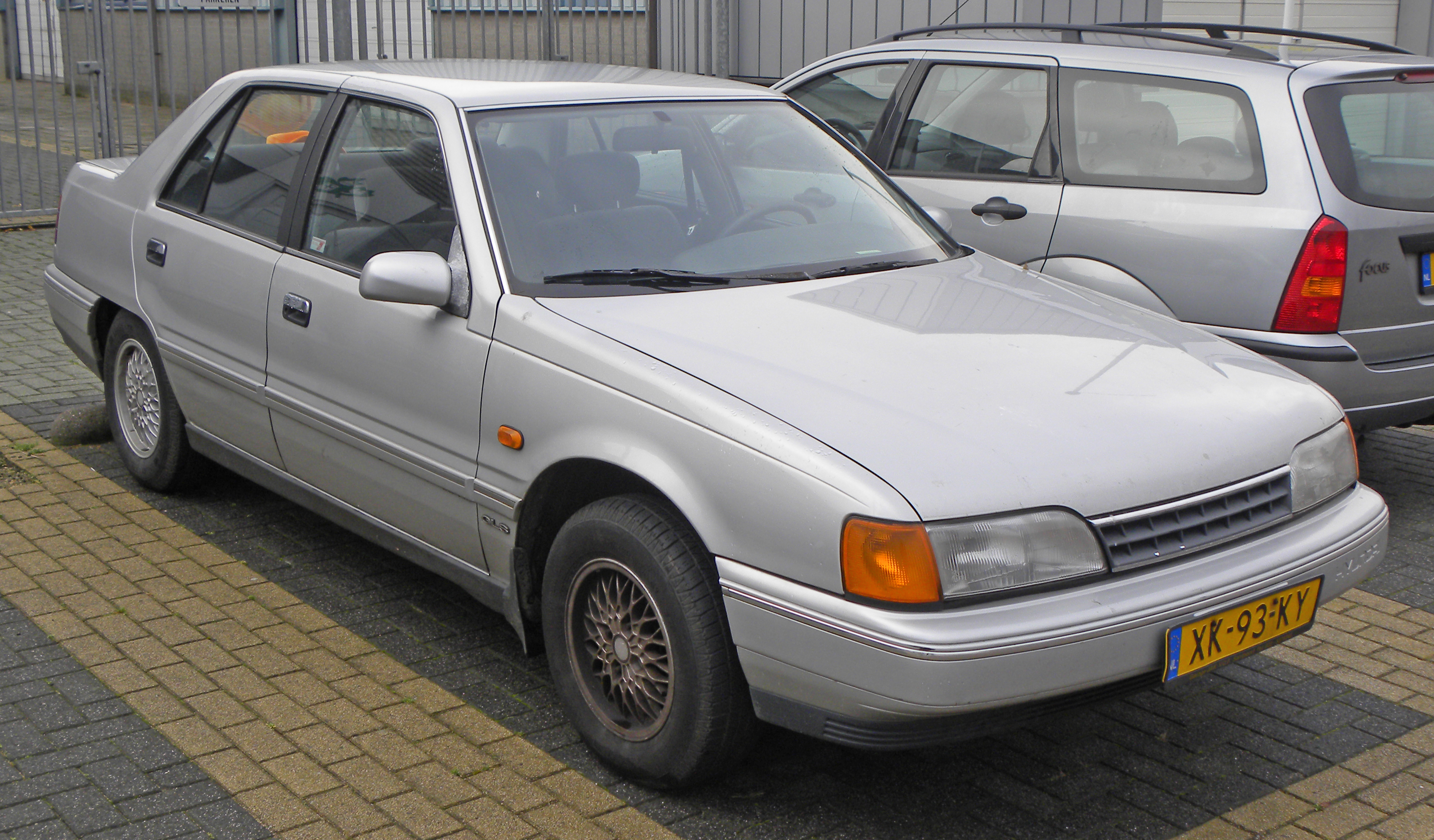
- 1989 Hyundai Sonata 2.4 GLS (pre-facelift)

Overview
- Model code: Y2
- Production: 1988–1993
- Assembly: South Korea: Ulsan; Canada: Bromont, Quebec (Hyundai Bromont Manufacturing Plant)
- Designer: Giorgetto Giugiaro at Italdesign (1986)

Body and chassis
- Related: Mitsubishi Galant Σ

Powertrain
- Engine: 1.8 L Sirius I4; 2.0 L Sirius I4; 2.4 L Sirius I4; 3.0 L Sigma V6
- Transmission: 5-speed manual 4-speed automatic

Dimensions
- Wheelbase: 2,650 mm (104.3 in)
- Length: 4,680 mm (184.3 in)
- Width: 1,750 mm (68.9 in)
- Height: 1,410 mm (55.5 in)
- Curb weight: 1,240–1,348 kg (2,734–2,972 lb)

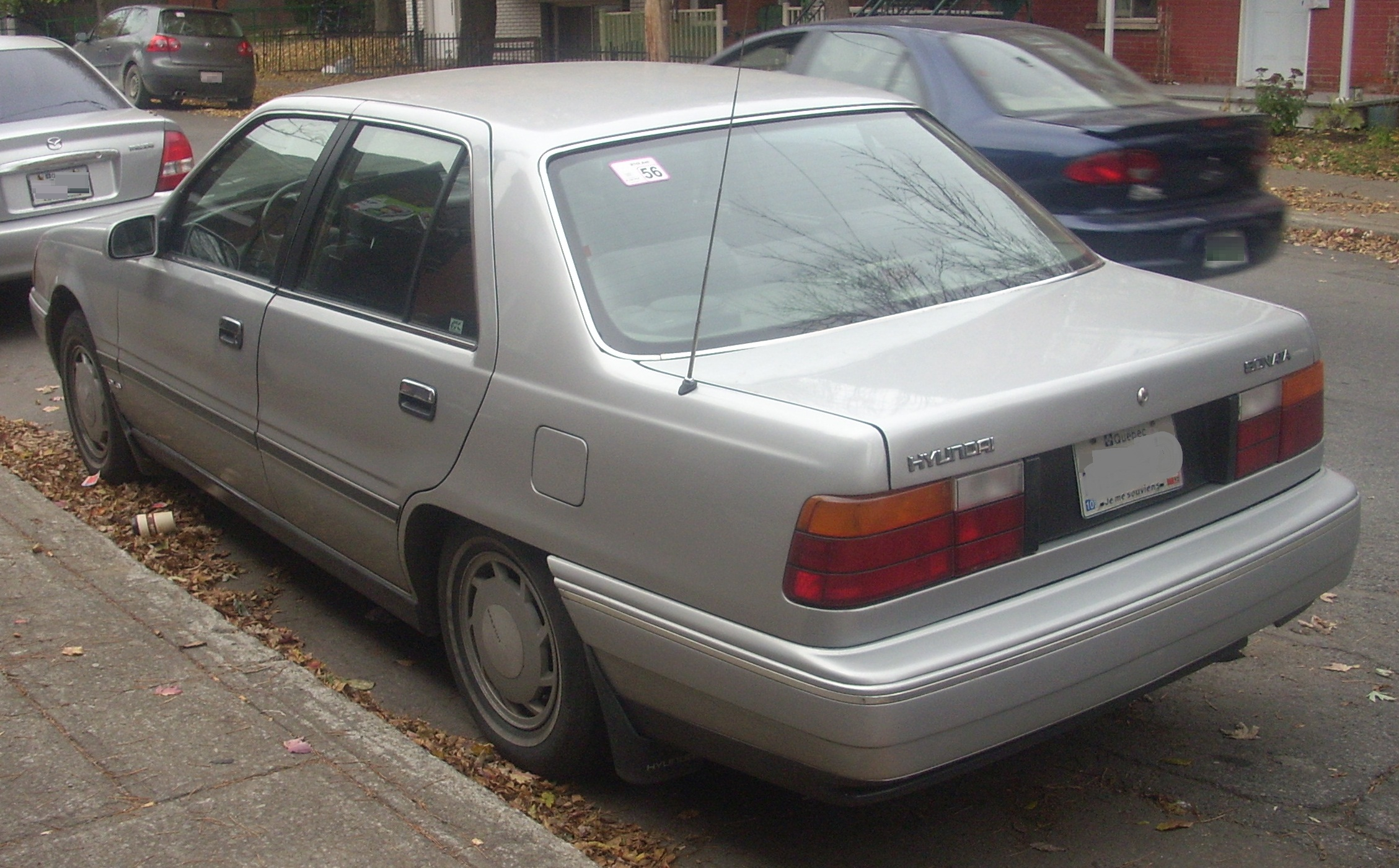
Hyundai Sonata (pre-facelift)

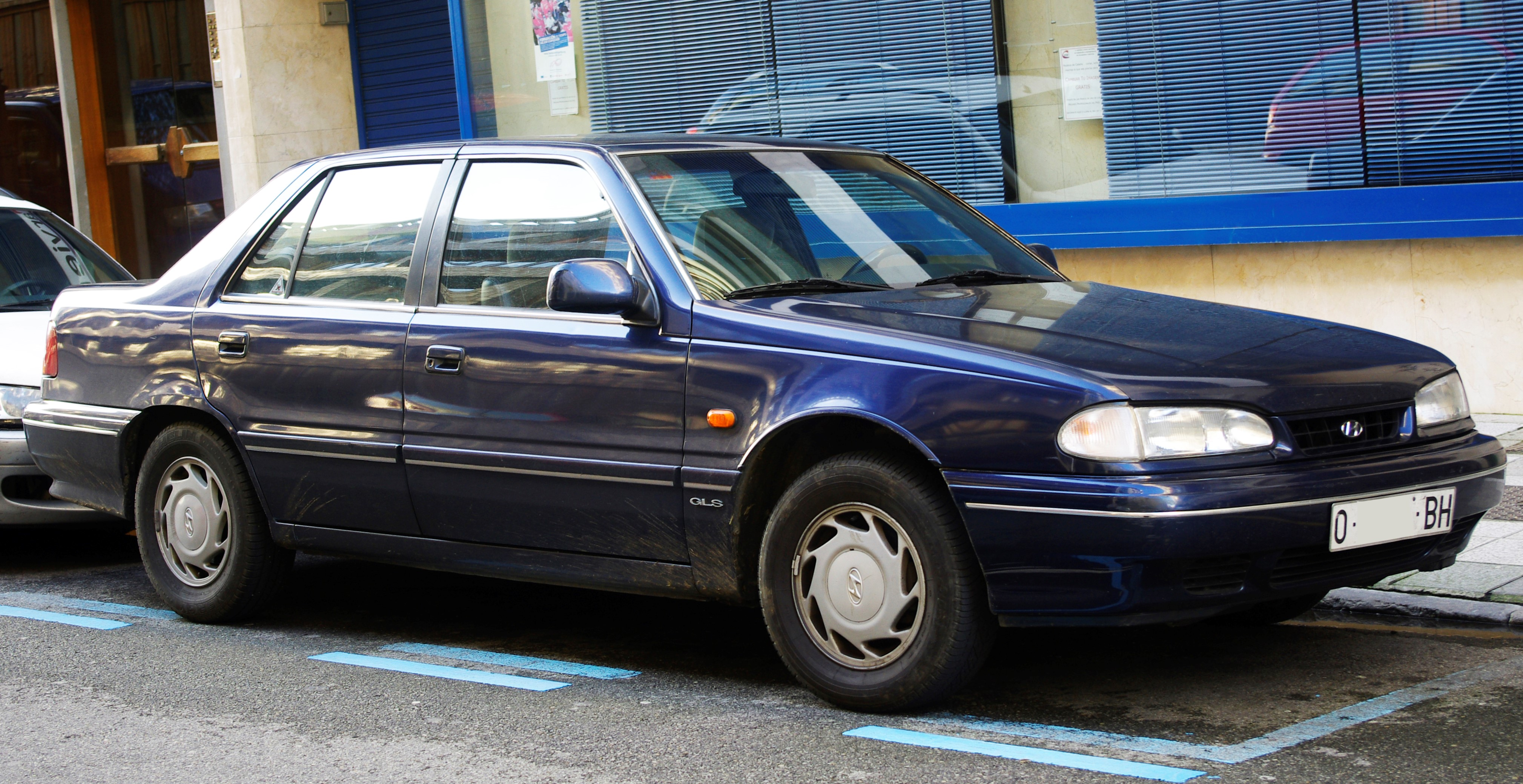

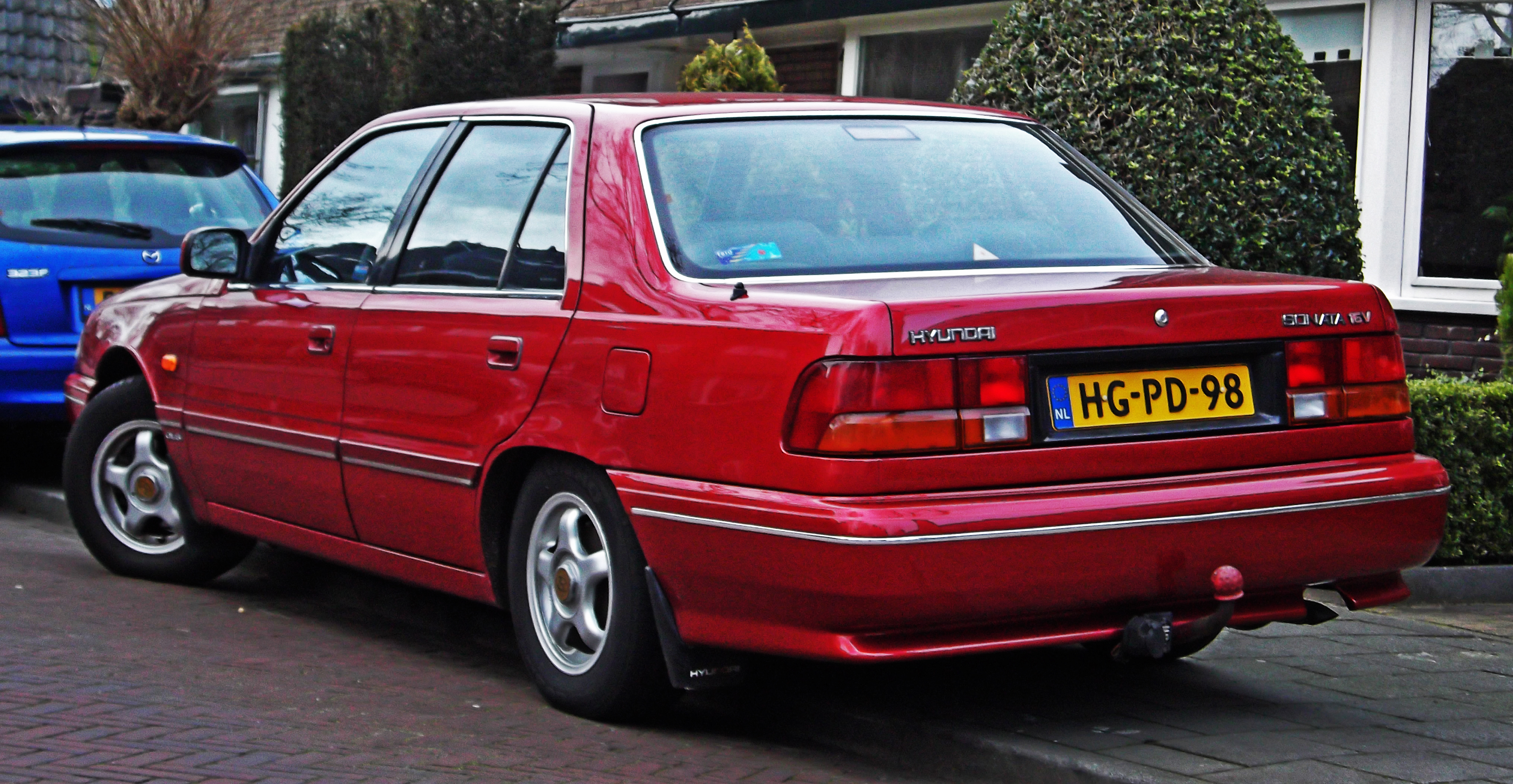
Hyundai Sonata GLS (facelift)

The Y2 Sonata was part of Hyundai's expansion in North America after the success of the Excel. It was introduced in South Korea on 1 June 1988. It was then introduced in Canada in September 1988 as a 1989 model, where it also entered production locally during 1989. It was presented on 14 November 1988 in the United States as a 1989 model, with sales beginning early 1989, and in March 1989 in Australia. The exterior was designed by Giorgetto Giugiaro of ItalDesign. The vehicle received a mid-term facelift in 1991. It replaced the Stellar as Hyundai's large family car. Sonatas were built in Ulsan, Korea, and in Bromont, Quebec. Hyundai and Chrysler had planned to sell 30,000 Canadian-built Sonatas yearly in the United States beginning in 1991, under Chrysler's Eagle brand. This, however, was not to be. Some Canadian Sonatas, starting with 500 cars in 1989, were exported to Taiwan to avoid that country's import quota on South Korean cars.

The Sonata was launched in Europe in June 1989, as the third model to be sold there following the Hyundai brand's European launch in 1982. It was aimed at buyers of cars including the Ford Granada Scorpio, but was priced to compete with smaller cars like the Ford Sierra.

The Sonata was designed by Hyundai and featured Mitsubishi's engineering, including the platform from the Galant Σ and its 2.4-liter, Mitsubishi-designed engine. The engines were made under license in South Korea, and had Hyundai codes stamped on them, but otherwise were almost identical to Mitsubishi's Sirius inline-four engines. A 3.0-liter V6 engine based on the Mitsubishi 6G72 arrived in 1990. In European specifications, the 2.4 develops 118 PS (87 kW; 116 hp) at 4500 rpm, identical to the federalized version. Other markets also received 1.8- and 2.0-liter engines carried over from the first generation, but equipped with Hyundai's own MPI, replacing their carbureted counterparts used in the Y1 Sonata. The U.S. model received the DOHC 2.0-liter G4CP engine for the 1992 model year, replacing the original 2.4-liter SOHC G4CS engine.

Trim levels offered in the US:

- GL (1989–1991) with a 116 hp (87 kW) 2.4 single overhead cam engine [G4CS], (1992–1993) a 126 hp (94 kW) 2.0 DOHC engine [G4CP]
- GLS with a 142 hp (106 kW) 3.0-liter V6 engine

== Third generation (Y3; 1993) ==
Third generation
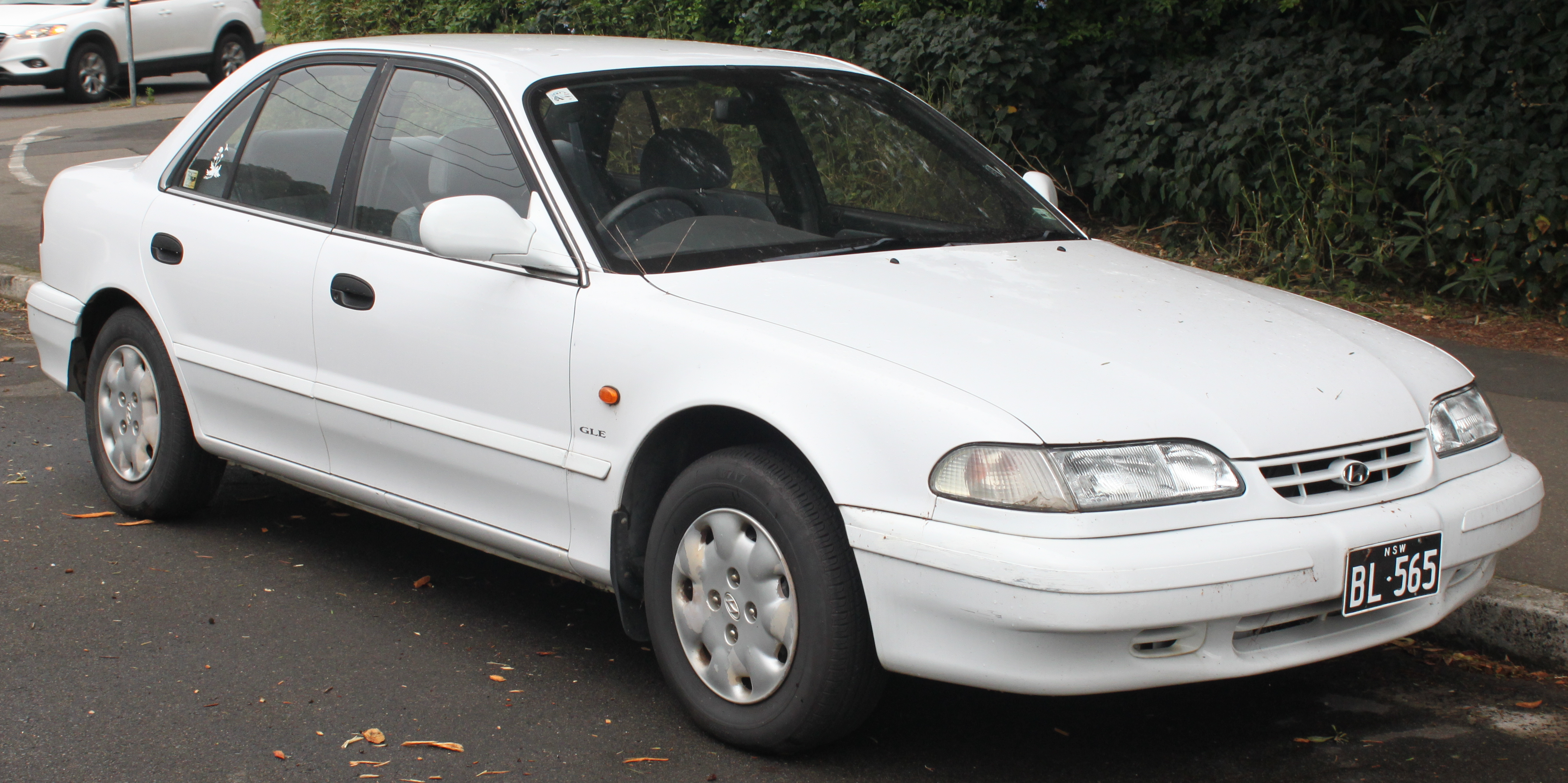

Overview
- Model code: Y3
- Also called: Hyundai Marcia (South Korea); Hyundai Sonica (Italy)
- Production: 1993–1998
- Model years: 1995–1998 (North America)
- Assembly: South Korea: Ulsan (1993–1996); South Korea: Asan (1996–1998); Botswana: Gaborone (TMBC)

Body and chassis
- Platform: Hyundai-Kia Y3

Powertrain
- Engine: 1.8 L G4CM I4; 1.8 L G4CN I4; 2.0 L G4CP I4; 3.0 L G6AT V6
- Transmission: 5-speed manual 4-speed automatic

Dimensions
- Wheelbase: 2,700 mm (106.3 in)
- Length: 4,700 mm (185.0 in)
- Width: 1,770 mm (69.7 in)
- Height: 1,405 mm (55.3 in)
- Curb weight: 1,236–1,310 kg (2,725–2,888 lb)

The Y3 Sonata debuted in 1993. The base engine in most markets was a 2.0-liter 77 kW (105 hp) Sirius inline-four, but there was a 3.0-liter, 107 kW (145 hp) Mitsubishi V6 option in some markets. This generation continued after the demise of the Bromont, Quebec plant in September 1993. After that, all Sonatas would be built in Korea, until the opening of the Beijing Hyundai plant in December 2002.

The third generation Y3 model was also produced as the Hyundai Marcia between 1995 and 1998, selling alongside the Sonata in South Korea only. The Marcia differed from the Sonata with its restyled front and rear fascias.

=== Facelift (1996–1998) ===
A facelift for the Y3 in 1996 saw modifications to the front and rear. The four-cylinder engine output was also increased to 92 kW (125 hp) for that year as well. The Y3 facelift was the last Sonata produced in Ulsan.

At one time, in the South Korea, there was a rumor that if students had the S-shaped emblem, they could go to a prestigious university (Seoul National University), and if they had the letter III, they could get a score of 300 on the College Scholastic Ability Test, which led to the Onata incident in which test takers secretly removed the Sonata III emblem. Therefore, there were many Sonata IIIs with the letters S and III missing from the emblem and for this reason, Hyundai Motors implemented a free emblem replacement service.

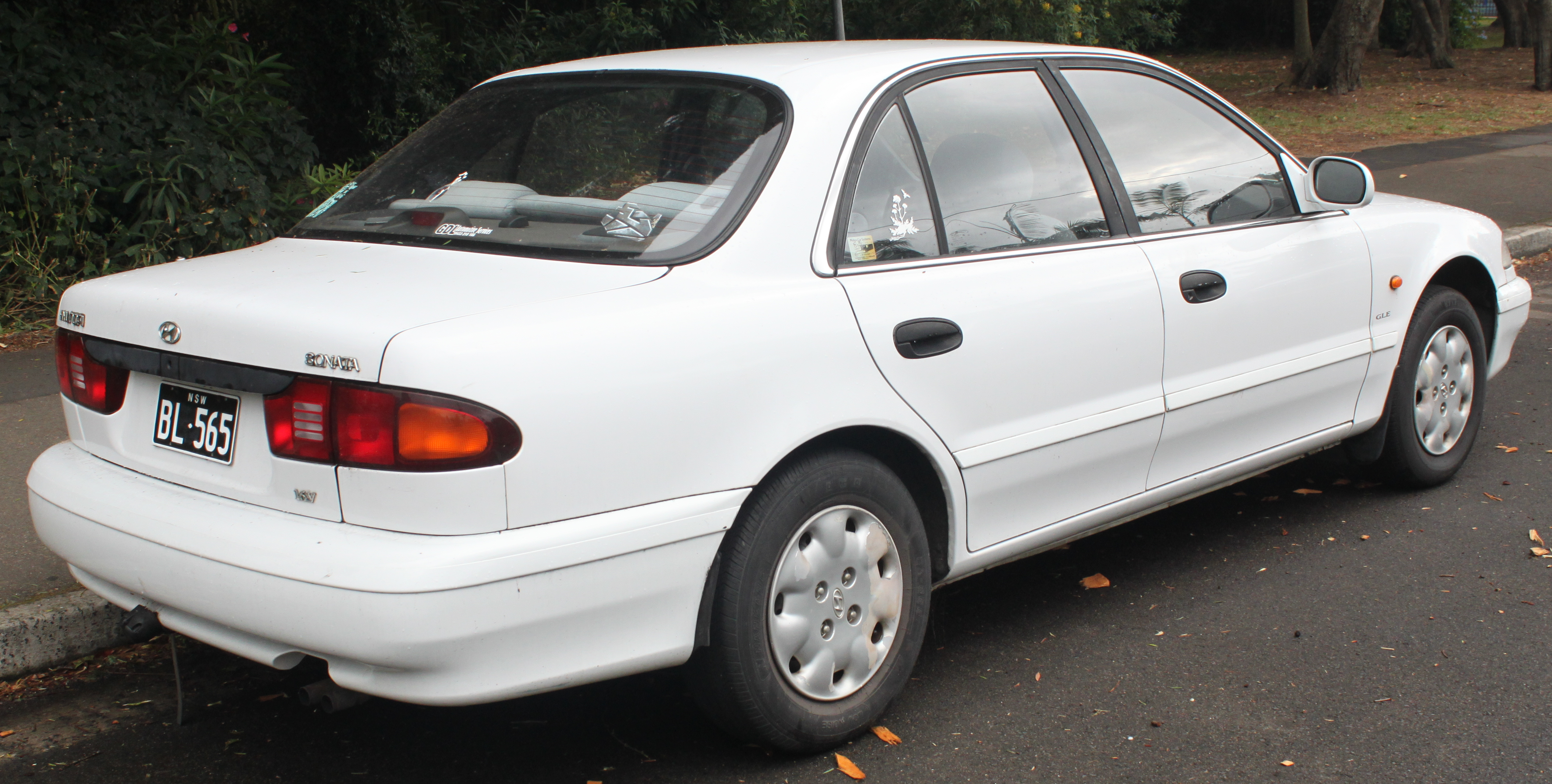
Hyundai Sonata GLE (pre-facelift; Australia)

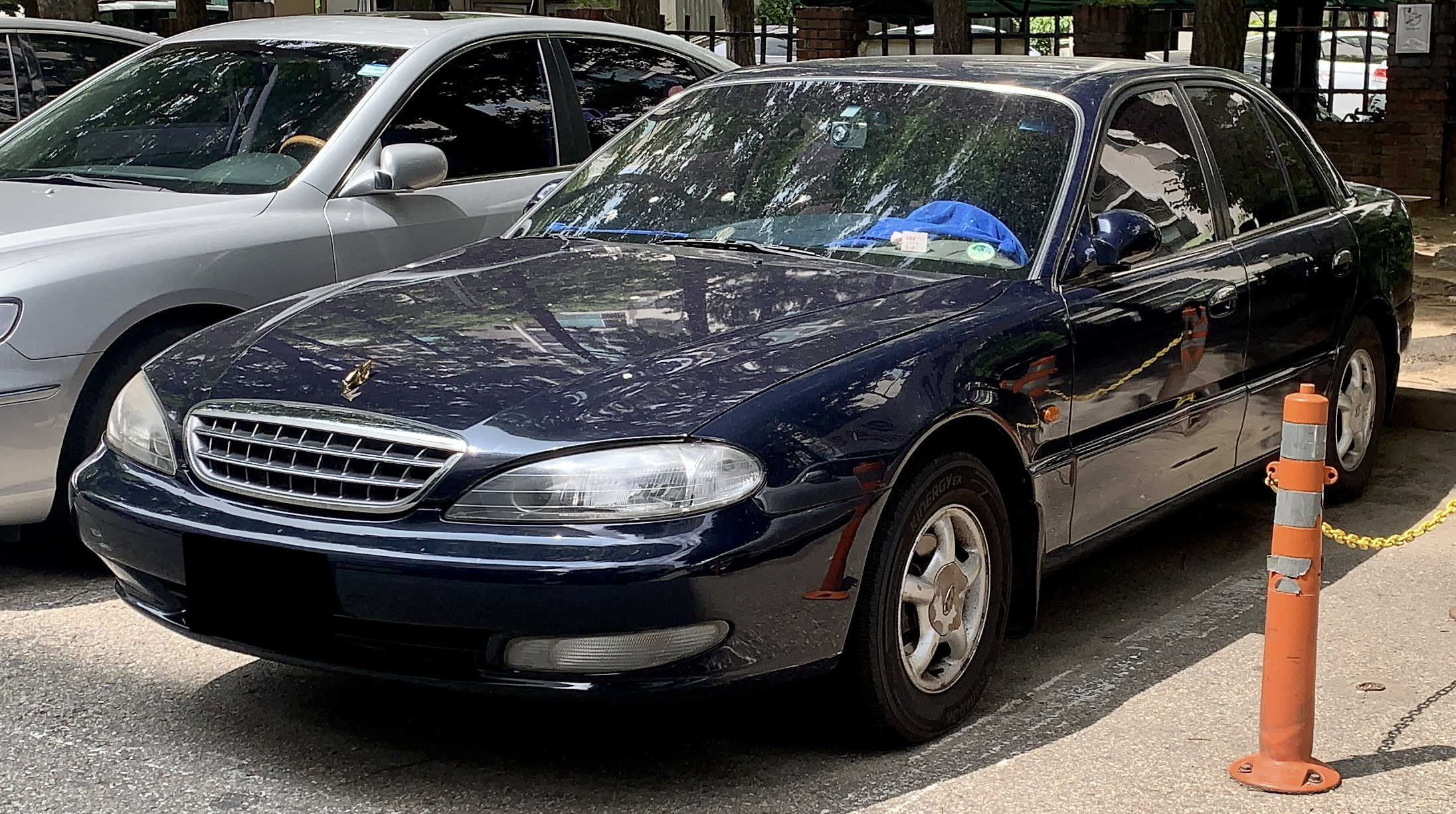
1996 Hyundai Marcia (South Korea)

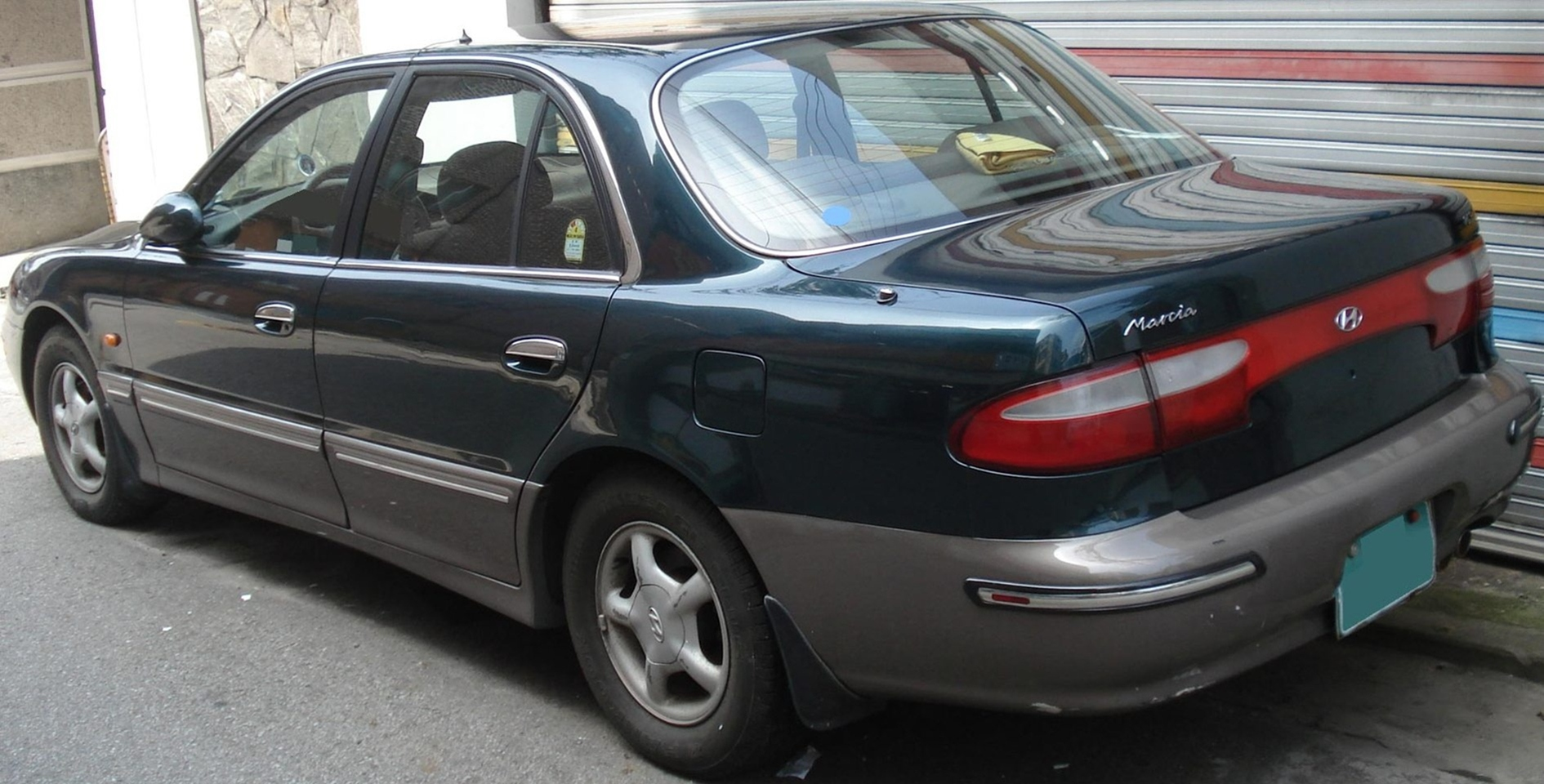
1996 Hyundai Marcia (South Korea)

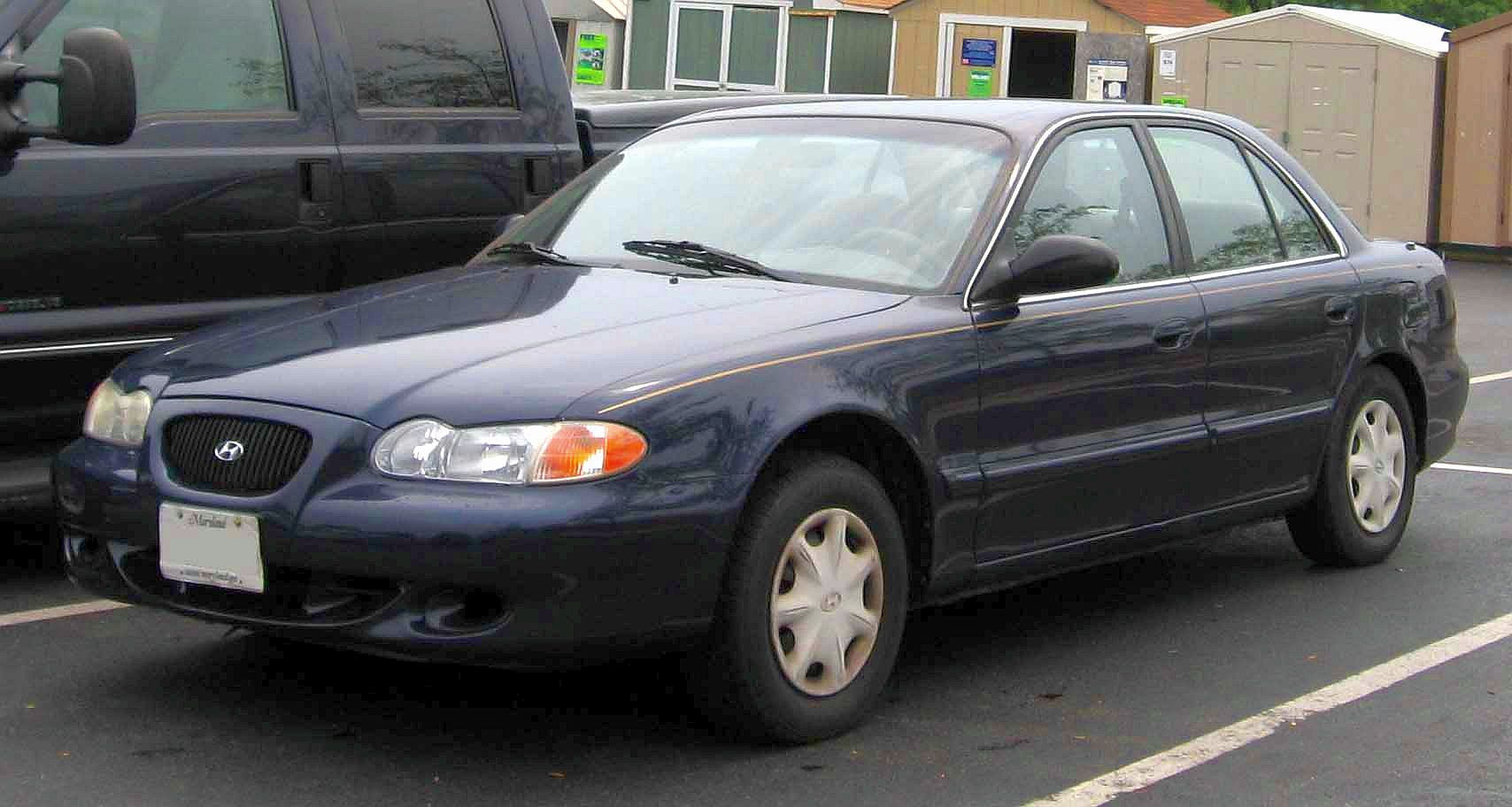
Hyundai Sonata (facelift, US)

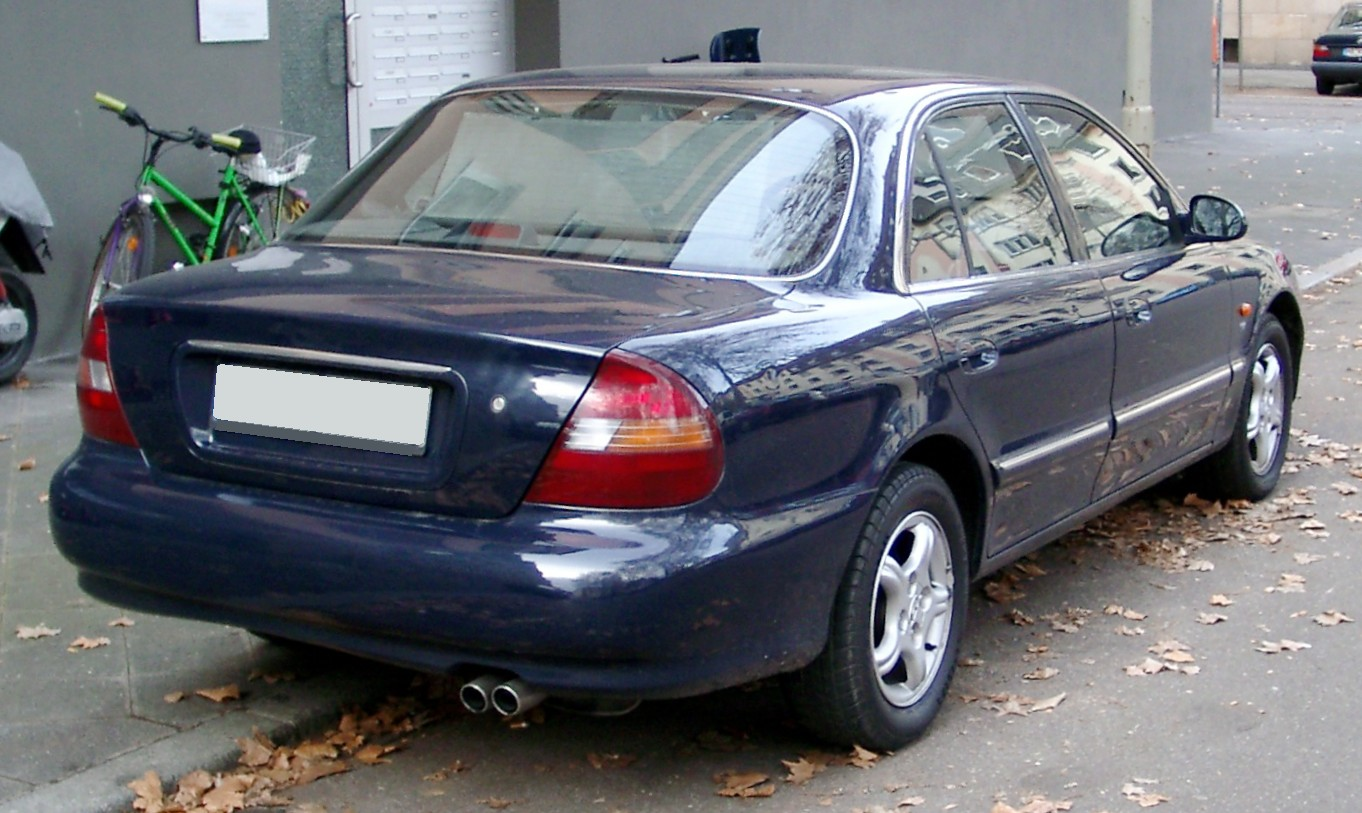
Hyundai Sonata (facelift, Europe)

== Fourth generation (EF; 1998) ==
Fourth generation
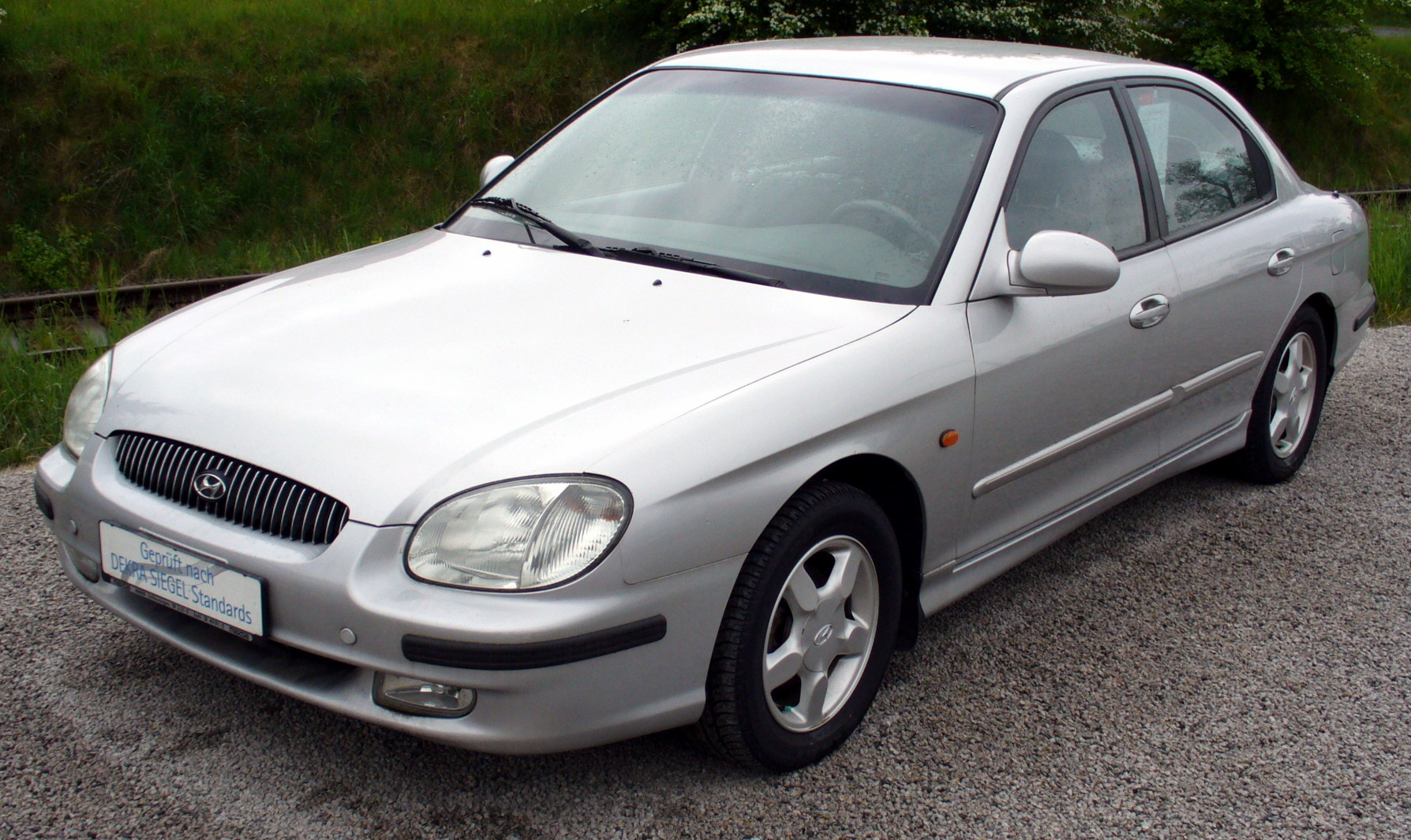
- Hyundai Sonata (EF, pre-facelift)

Overview
- Model code: EF
- Also called: Hyundai Sonica (Italy); Hyundai Sonata Vivante (South Africa); Hyundai Sonata Prima (Egypt); Hyundai Moinca (China); Hyundai Sonata Gold (India)
- Production: 1998–2001 (South Korea, EF); 2001–2004 (South Korea, EF-B); 2001–2005 (India); 2002–2017 (China); 2005–2012 (Russia)
- Model years: 1999–2001 (EF); 2002–2005 (EF-B)
- Assembly: South Korea: Asan; Botswana: Gaborone (TMBC); India: Chennai (Hyundai India); Egypt: Cairo (AAV); China: Beijing (Beijing Hyundai); Russia: Taganrog (TagAZ); Malaysia: Johor Bahru

Body and chassis
- Platform: Hyundai-Kia Y4
- Related: Kia Optima

Powertrain
- Engine: petrol: 1.8 L Beta II I4; 1.8 L Sirius II I4; 2.0 L Beta II I4 (China); 2.0 L Sirius II I4; 2.4 L Sirius II I4; 2.5 L Delta V6; 2.7 L Delta V6
- Transmission: 5-speed manual 4-speed automatic CVT

Dimensions
- Wheelbase: 2,700 mm (106.3 in)
- Length: 4,710 mm (185.4 in) (Pre-facelift); 4,745 mm (186.8 in) (Facelift)
- Width: 1,815 mm (71.5 in) (Pre-facelift); 1,820 mm (71.7 in) (Facelift)
- Height: 1,410 mm (55.5 in) (Pre-facelift); 1,420 mm (55.9 in) (Facelift)
- Curb weight: 1,315–1,487 kg (2,899–3,278 lb)

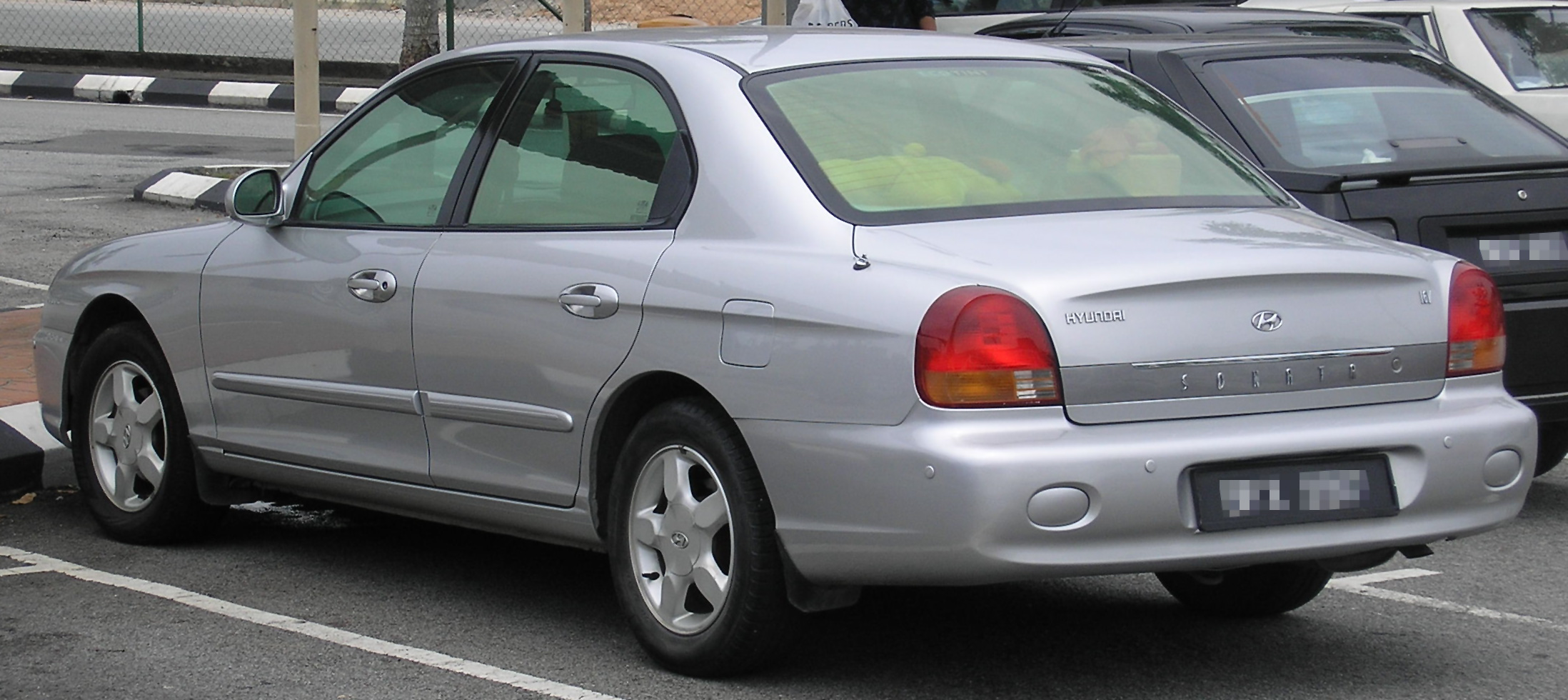
Hyundai Sonata EF (pre-facelift; Malaysia)

The new EF series Sonata arrived in 1998, debuting the Hyundai-Kia Y4 platform. Compared to the Y3 predecessor, the EF grew slightly in size, but shared the same 2,700 mm (106.3 in) wheelbase. It also introduced double wishbone front suspension and independent, multi-link rear suspension. Initial engines from launch were the 2.0-liter with 136 PS (100 kW; 134 hp), and a 2.5-liter V6 with 168 PS (124 kW; 166 hp)—the G6BW model of Hyundai Delta V6.

The EF Sonata shares its underpinnings with the Hyundai Trajet and first-generation Hyundai Santa Fe, which became the company's first compact crossover SUV. The first generation Kia Optima (marketed as the Magentis outside the United States) was also based on the EF Sonata, sharing doors and roof panels.

=== Facelift (2001–2004) ===
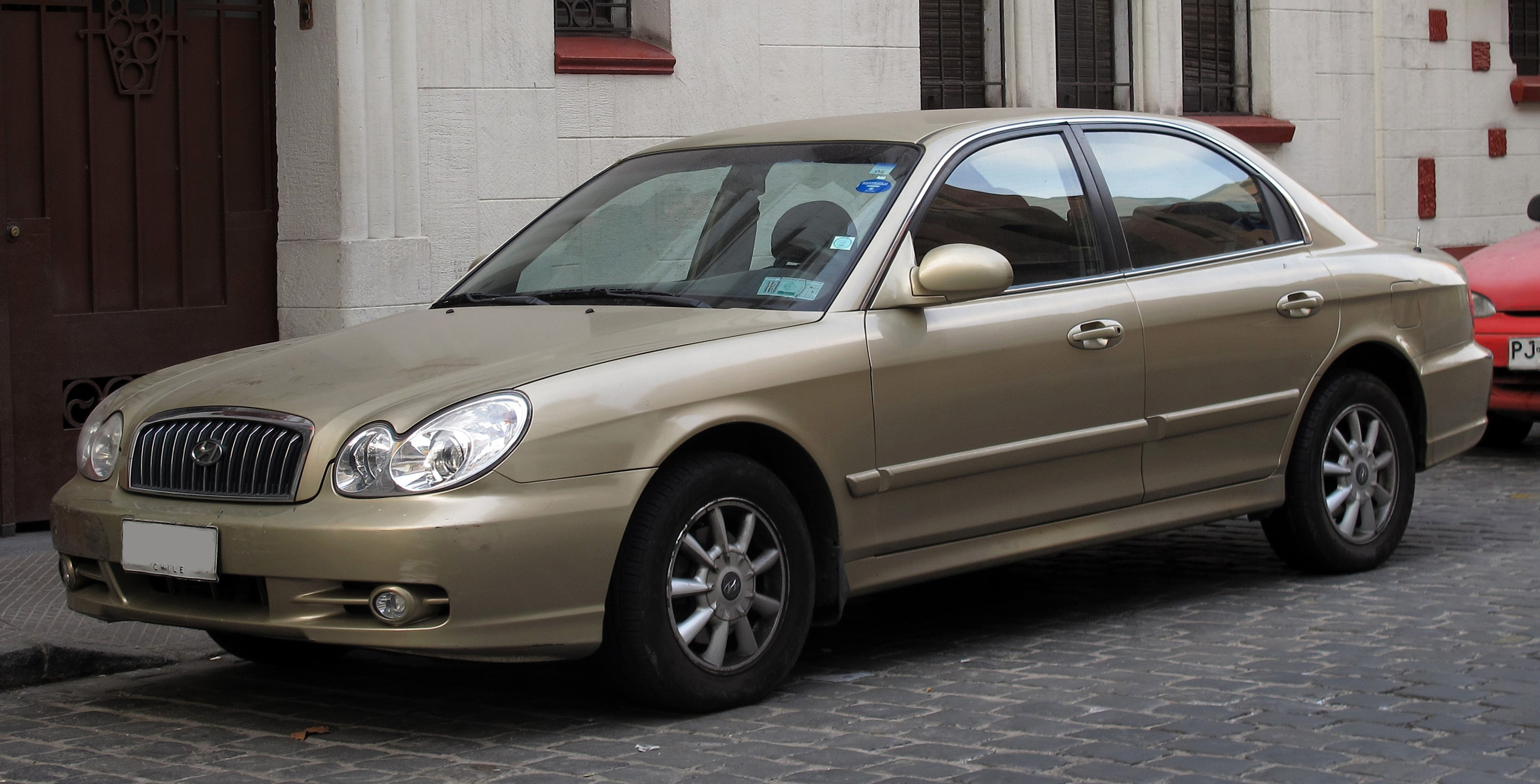

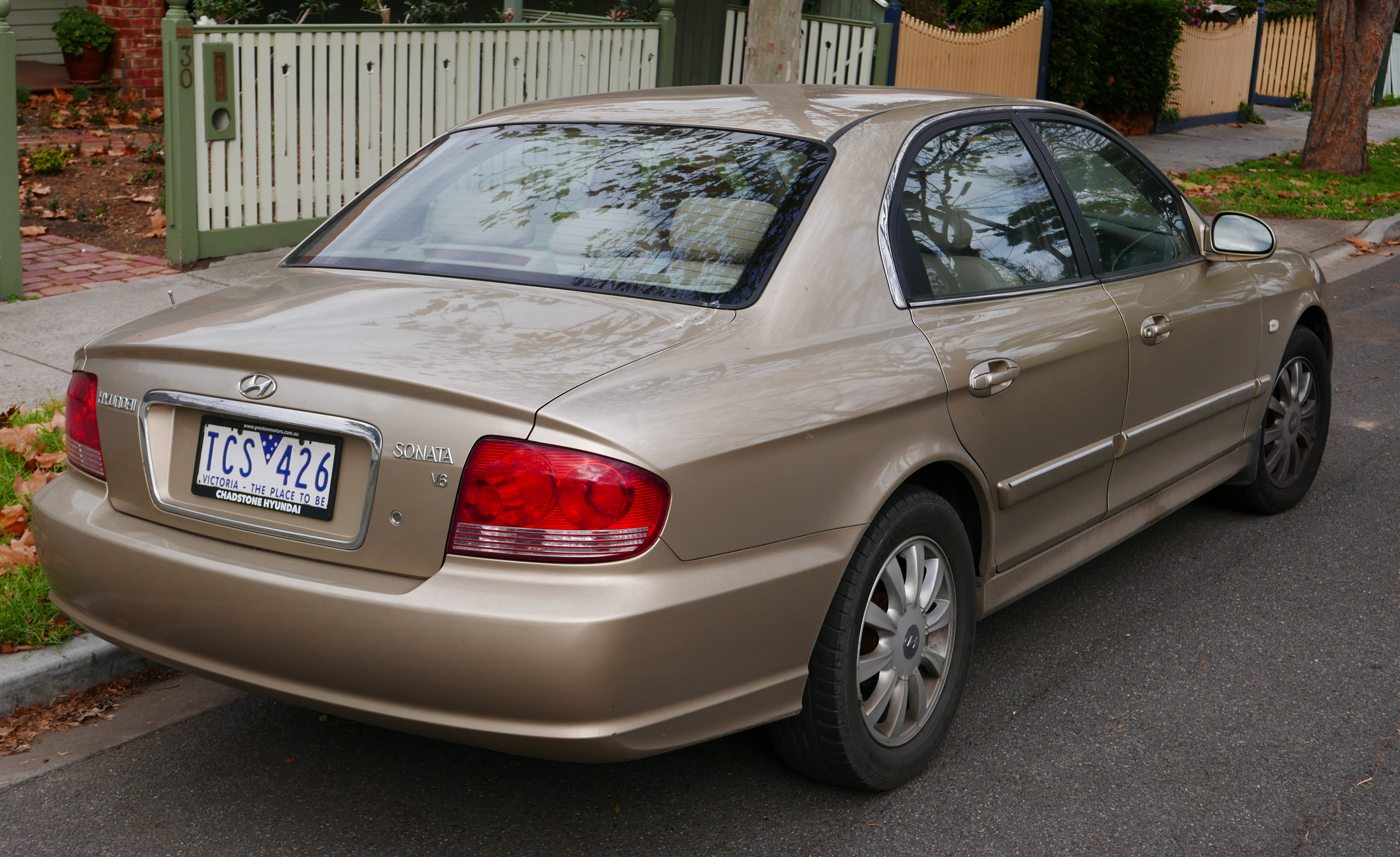
Hyundai Sonata (EF-B; facelift)

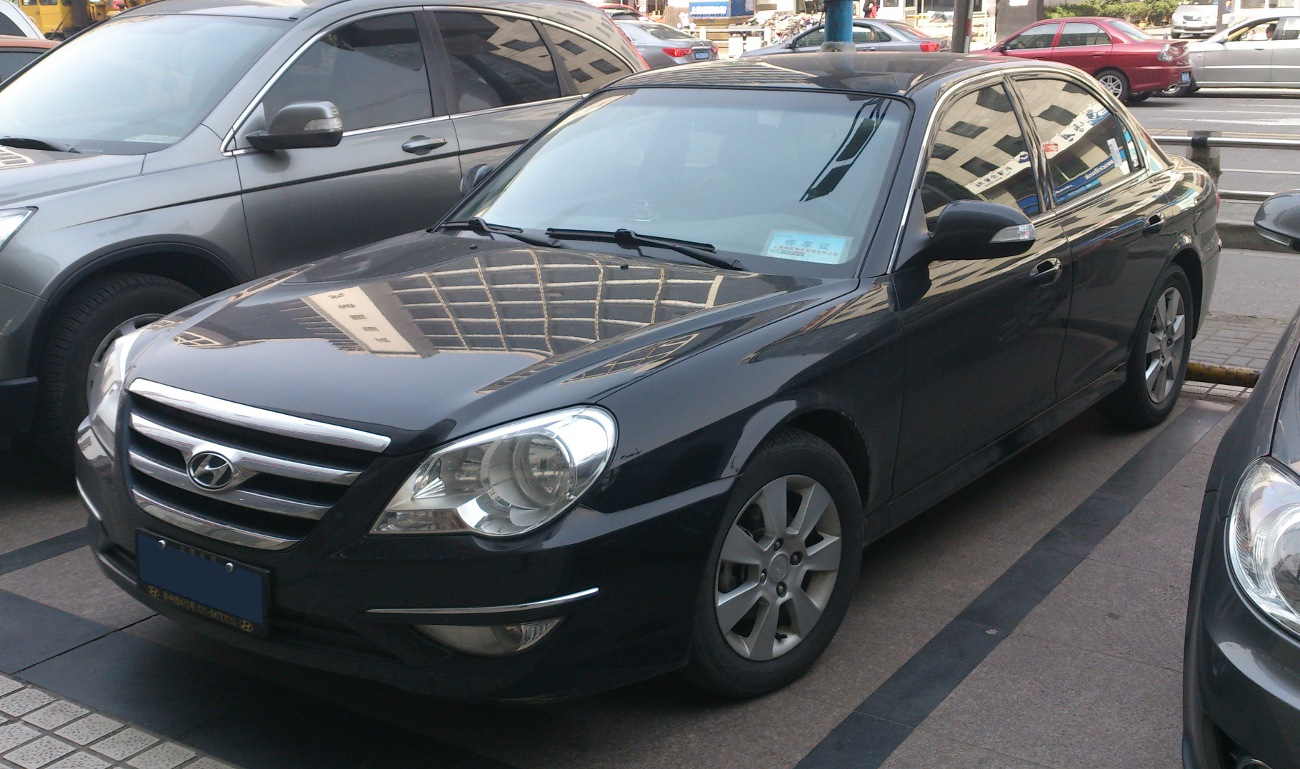
Hyundai Moinca – facelifted fourth generation Sonata (China only)

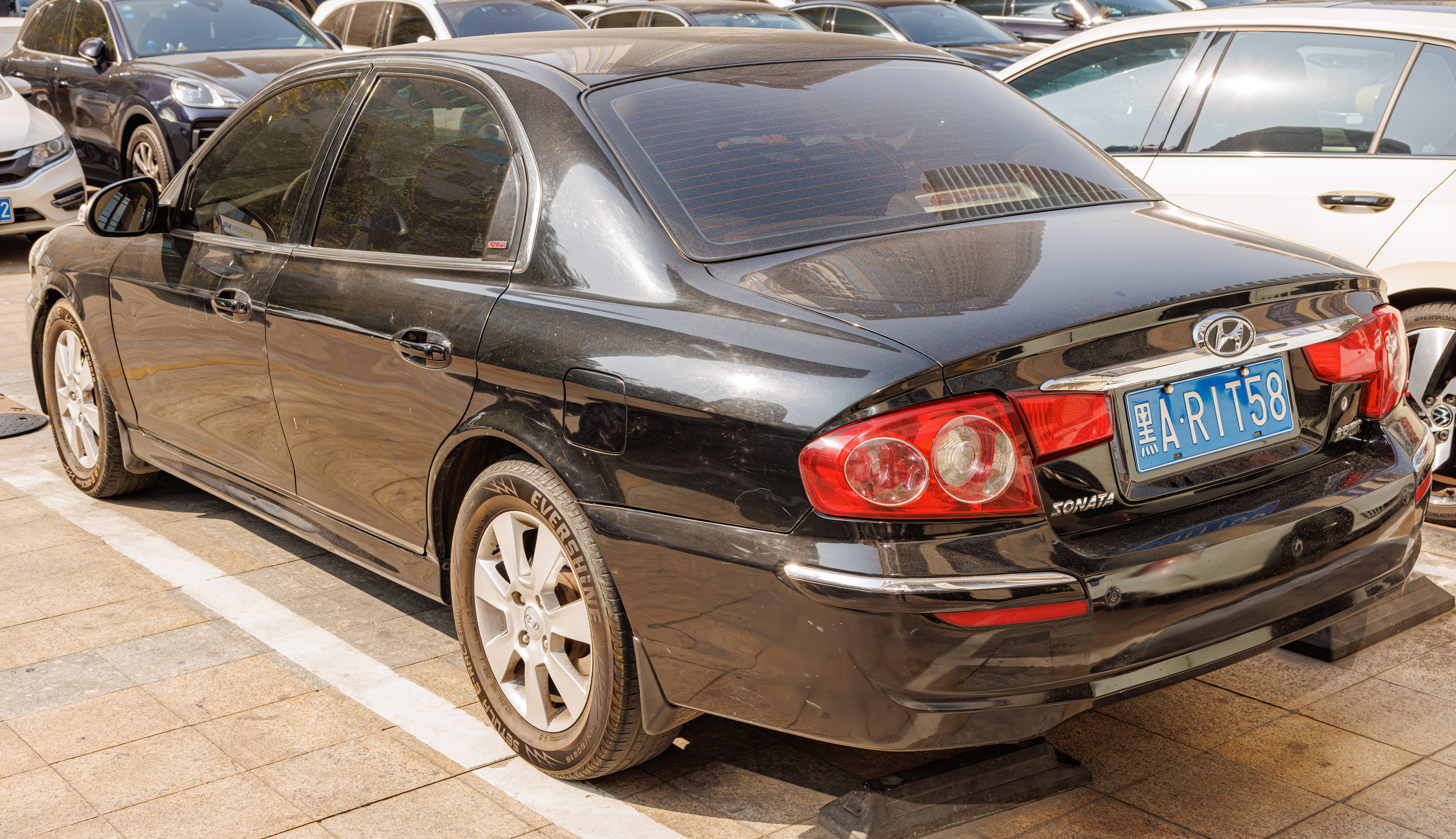
Hyundai Moinca – facelifted fourth generation Sonata (China only, rear)

Hyundai facelifted the EF series in 2001 for the 2002 model year as the EF-B series, revising the hood/bonnet, grille, headlights, which now resemble those found on the second-generation Mercedes-Benz C-Class, tail-lights and rear license plate location from the fascia to the trunk lid — as well as revising the dash and seats.

Hyundai strengthened the body shell and firewall, widened the rear track, included anti-submarining front seat pans and added thicker front brake discs for the update.

The EF-B model featured an all-aluminum, G6BAY series 2.7-liter Delta V6 with 174 hp (130 kW; 176 PS) and 181 lb⋅ft (245 N⋅m), as well as the Sirius II 2.4-liter inline-four rated at 138 hp (103 kW) and 147 lb⋅ft (199 N⋅m) of torque.

This Sonata continued in production as of 2002 and was marketed in China from December 2002, by Beijing Hyundai. A facelifted Sonata was produced by that company in August 2009, marketed as the Moinca. This model is only available in the Chinese market and comes with a 1.8 or 2.0 liter engine with transmission choices consisting of a five-speed manual or a four-speed automatic.

The Sonata was manufactured by TagAZ in Russia until 2012.

=== Safety ===
ANCAP test results* Hyundai Sontana GLE sedan (2000)
Test	Score
Overall	2 /5 stars
Frontal offset	0/16
Side impact	9.80/16
Pole	Not Assessed
Seat belt reminders	0/3
Whiplash protection	Not Assessed
Pedestrian protection	Not Assessed
Electronic stability control	Not Assessed

== Fifth generation (NF; 2004) ==
Fifth generation
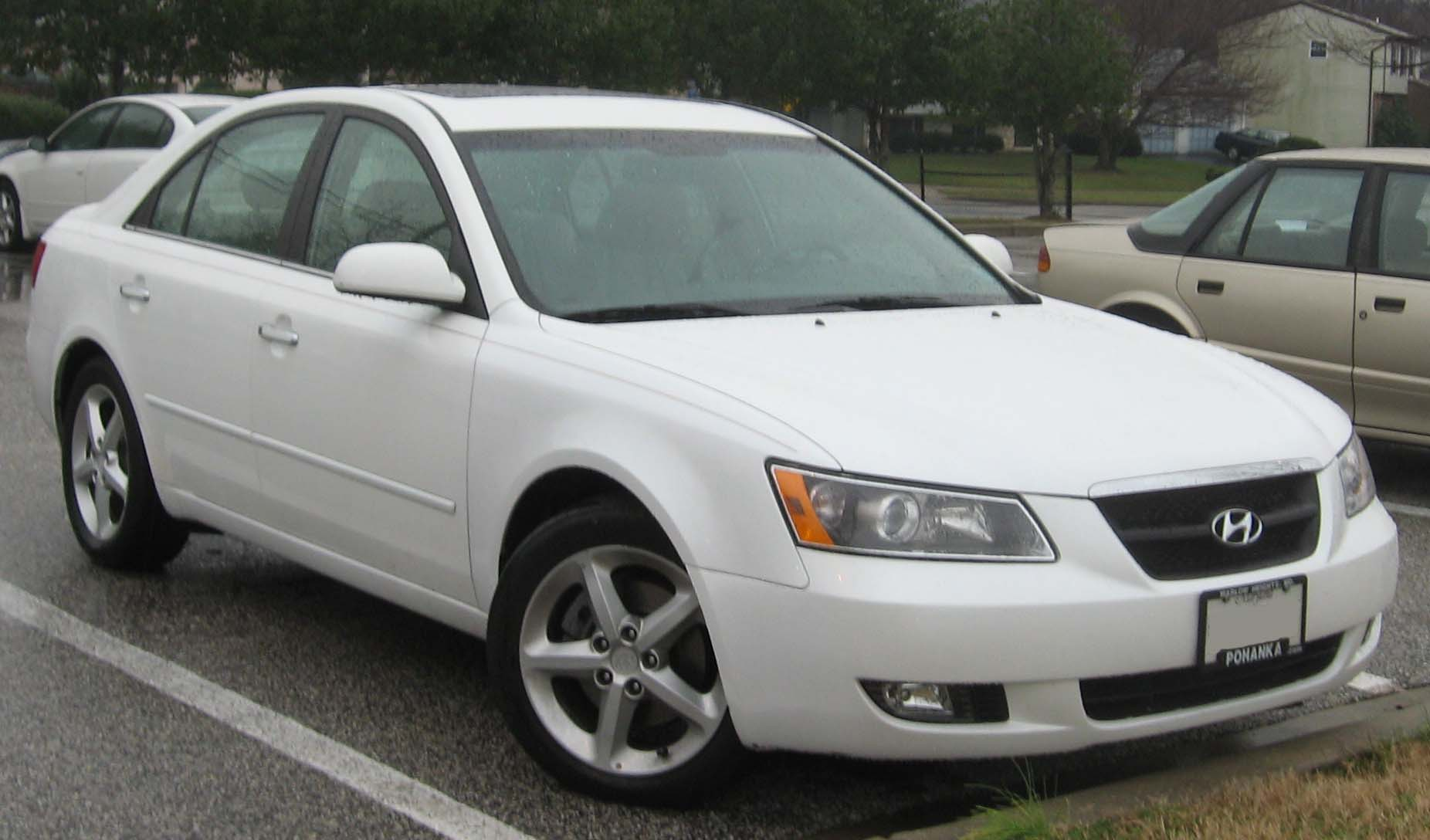
- Hyundai Sonata (pre-facelift)

Overview
- Model code: NF
- Also called: Hyundai NF (Russia); Hyundai NF Sonata (Russia, facelifted version); Hyundai Sonata Embera (India); Hyundai Sonica (Italy); Hyundai Sonata CNG (Thailand)
- Production: 2004–2009; 2005–2010 (North America); 2005–2010 (China); 2006–2010 (Thailand)
- Model years: 2005–2009; 2006–2010 (North America); 2006–2011 (China); 2007–2010 (Thailand)
- Assembly: South Korea: Asan; United States: Montgomery, Alabama (HMMA); India: Chennai (Hyundai India); China: Beijing (Beijing Hyundai); Turkey: İzmit (Hyundai Assan); Egypt: Cairo (Ghabbour Group); Thailand: Samut Prakan (TAAP); Sudan: Al Jazirah state (Giad)
- Designer: Choi Jong Min (2002)

Body and chassis
- Related: Kia Optima

Powertrain
- Engine: 2.0 L Theta I4; 2.0 L Theta II I4; 2.4 L Theta I4; 2.4 L Theta II I4; 3.3 L Lambda V6; 2.0 L Theta LPi I4; 2.0 L D CRDi I4
- Transmission: 4-speed F4A42 automatic by Mitsubishi; 5-speed manual 6-speed manual (2.0 CRDI); 5-speed automatic

Dimensions
- Wheelbase: 2,730 mm (107.5 in)
- Length: 4,800 mm (189.0 in); 4,815 mm (189.6 in) (Sonata Ling Xiang)
- Width: 1,830 mm (72.0 in)
- Height: 1,475 mm (58.1 in)
- Curb weight: 1,443–1,612 kg (3,181–3,554 lb)

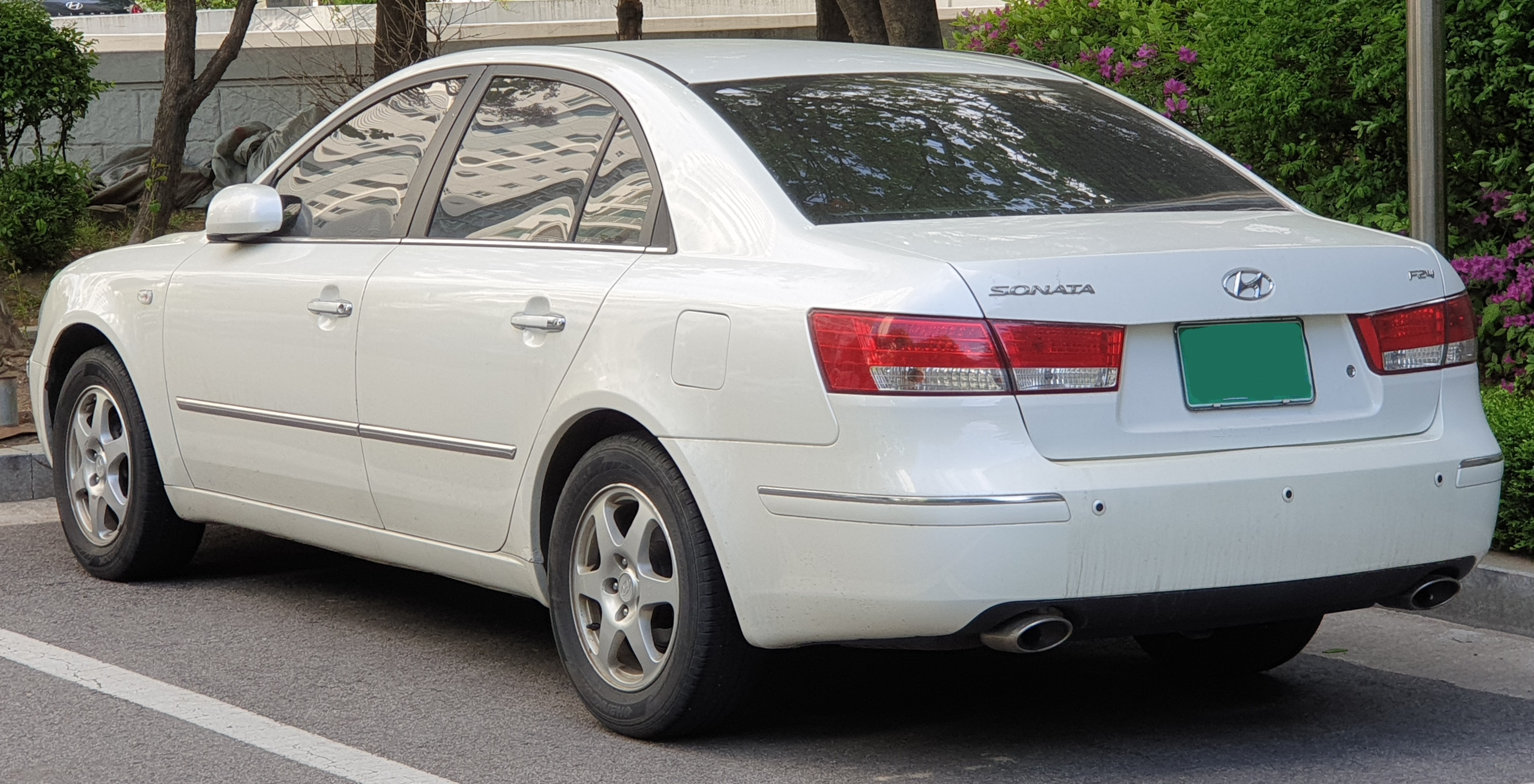
Rear view (pre-facelift)

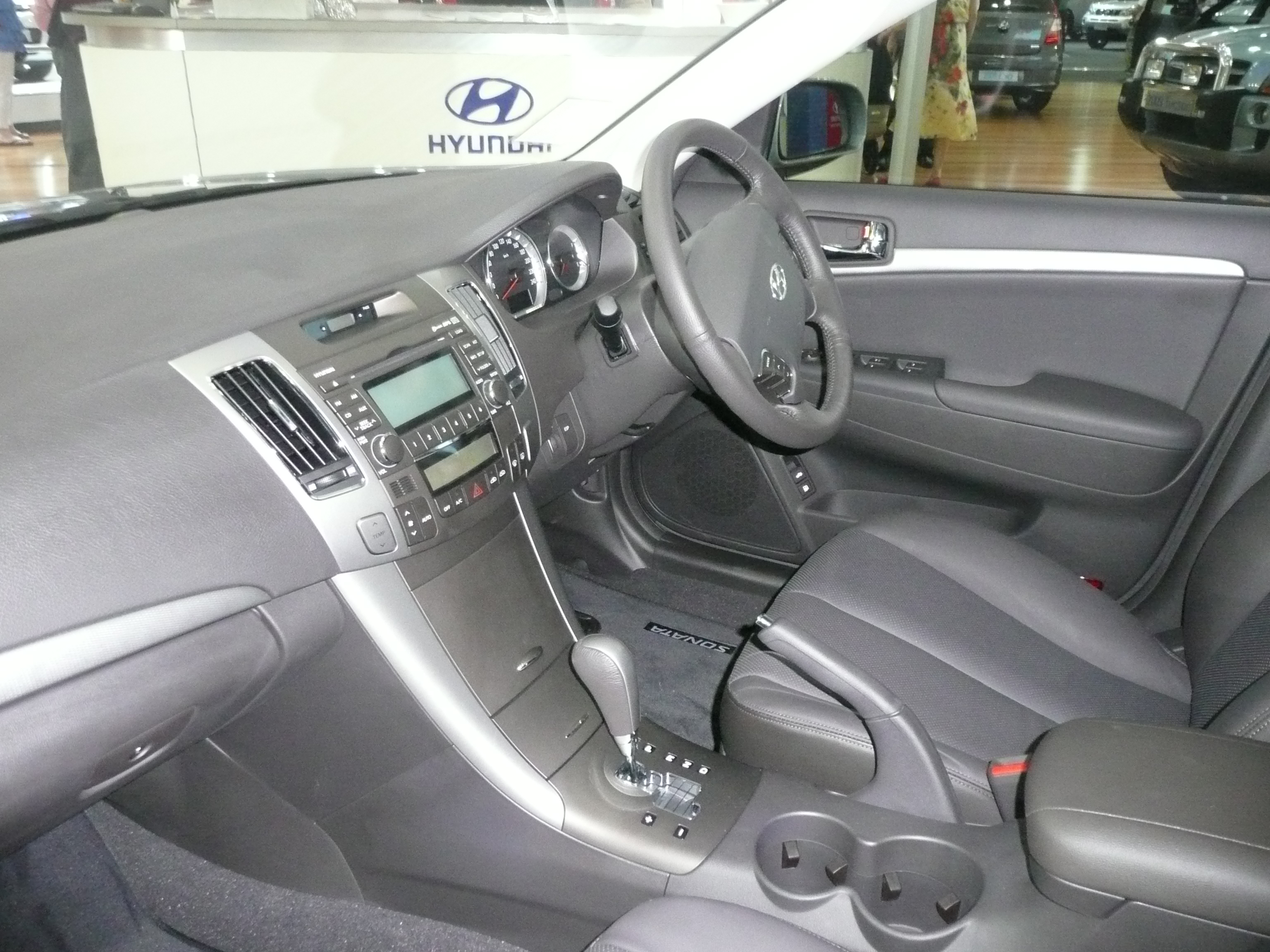
Interior (post-facelift)

The NF Sonata was launched in August 2004 in South Korea, based on a new platform created from the project NF. The company's first all-aluminum I4 engine, dubbed Theta, debuted in the new Sonata. Engine choices at launch were a 2.4-liter I4 rated 164 hp (122 kW) at 5800 rpm with 4-speed automatic by Mitsubishi, and a 3.3-liter V6 rated 237 hp (177 kW) V6 with 5-speed automatic. In Korea, the 2.4-liter option was sold as the F24S (24 = 2.4L, S = Special). The 2.0-liter gasoline version was only sold in Korea and proved more popular there due to added gas, tax and insurance savings. Diesel versions are available in Europe, New Zealand and Singapore, where they are a popular replacement for the Toyota Comfort taxi cab.

The U.S. May 2005 launch of the new Sonata coincided with the production commencement at the company's first U.S. assembly plant, in Montgomery, Alabama.

Classified by the U.S. Environmental Protection Agency as a mid-size car, the fourth generation was 2 in (51 mm) longer and taller and 1 in (25 mm) wider than the previous generation. Standard features in U.S. models included anti-lock braking system/electronic stability control/traction control system as well as six airbags (driver/front passenger front and side, and side curtain).

=== Safety ===
Europe: 2006 year models received the following European New Car Assessment Program (Euro NCAP) ratings:

Euro NCAP test results* Hyundai Sonata 2.4 GLS, RHD (2006)
Test	Score	Rating
Adult occupant:	27	4 /5 stars
Child occupant:	37	4 /5 stars
Pedestrian:	12	2 /4 stars

In Insurance Institute for Highway Safety tests the Sonata received a "Good" overall in the frontal impact crash test, an "Acceptable" overall score in the side impact crash test, and a "Good" rating for rear crash protection. In the roof strength evaluation 09 and 10 models were rated "Marginal".

2006 Hyundai Sonata tested by the U.S. National Highway Traffic Safety Administration (NHTSA):

- Frontal Rating (Driver):
- Frontal Rating (Passenger):
- Side Rating (Driver):
- Side Rating (Passenger):
- Rollover:

ANCAP test results* Hyundai Sontana variant(s) as tested (2005)
Test	Score
Overall	4 /5 stars
Frontal offset	9.02/16
Side impact	13.50/16
Pole	2/2
Seat belt reminders	2/3
Whiplash protection	Not Assessed
Pedestrian protection	Marginal
Electronic stability control	Optional

=== Recall ===
On June 28, 2005, when the IIHS tested the 2006 Sonata in the Moderate Overlap Test, the driver's seat went past the crash test dummy's head due to the seat belt getting tangled with the seat recline lever, giving the car a “Poor” rating. On August 1, 2005, the company put a plastic tag on the seat trim next to the lever to prevent the seat belt from hitting the lever, giving the car a “Good” Rating when retested in September, recalling nearly 36,000 cars in the process.

=== Facelift (2008–2010) ===
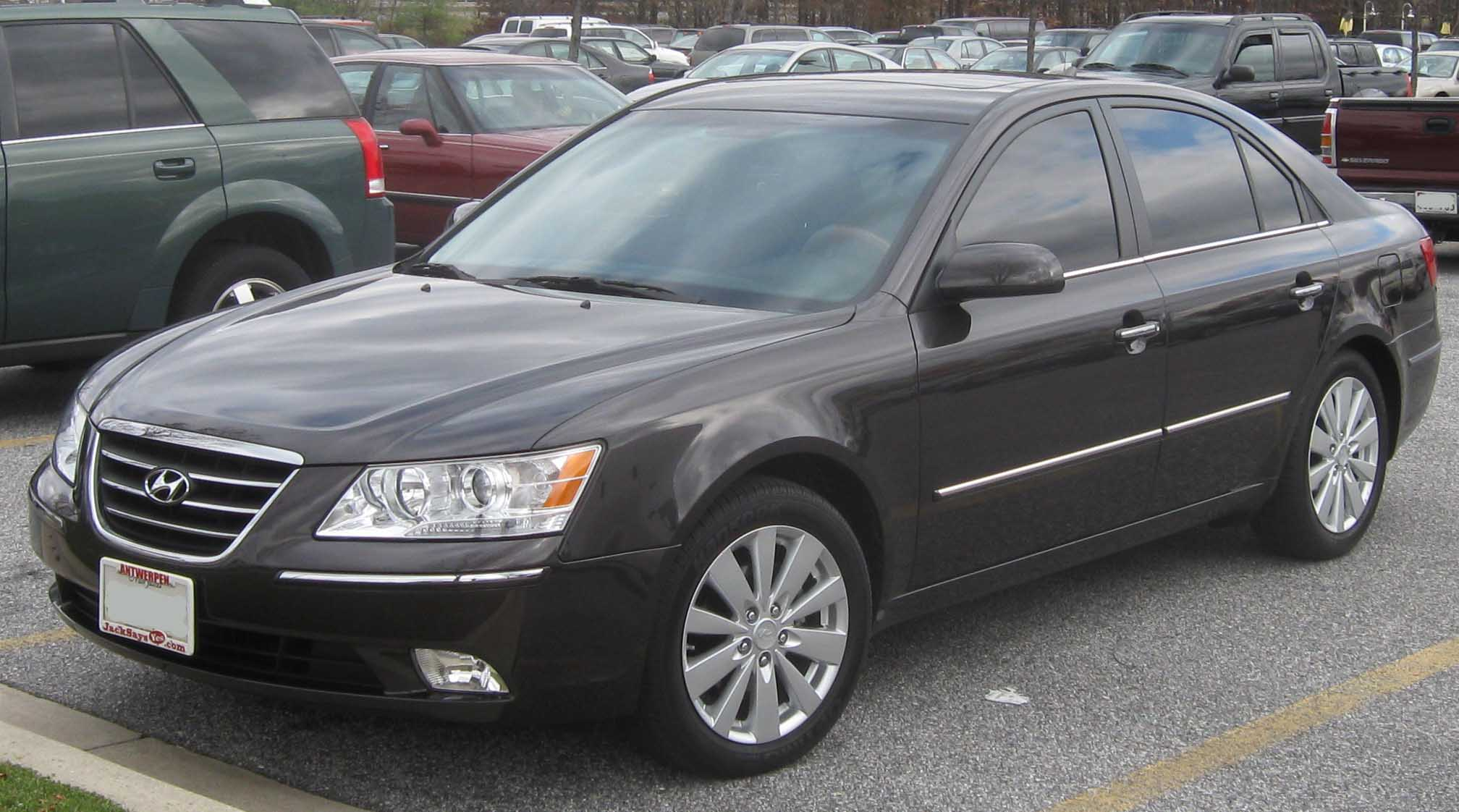
2009 Hyundai Sonata Limited (facelift)

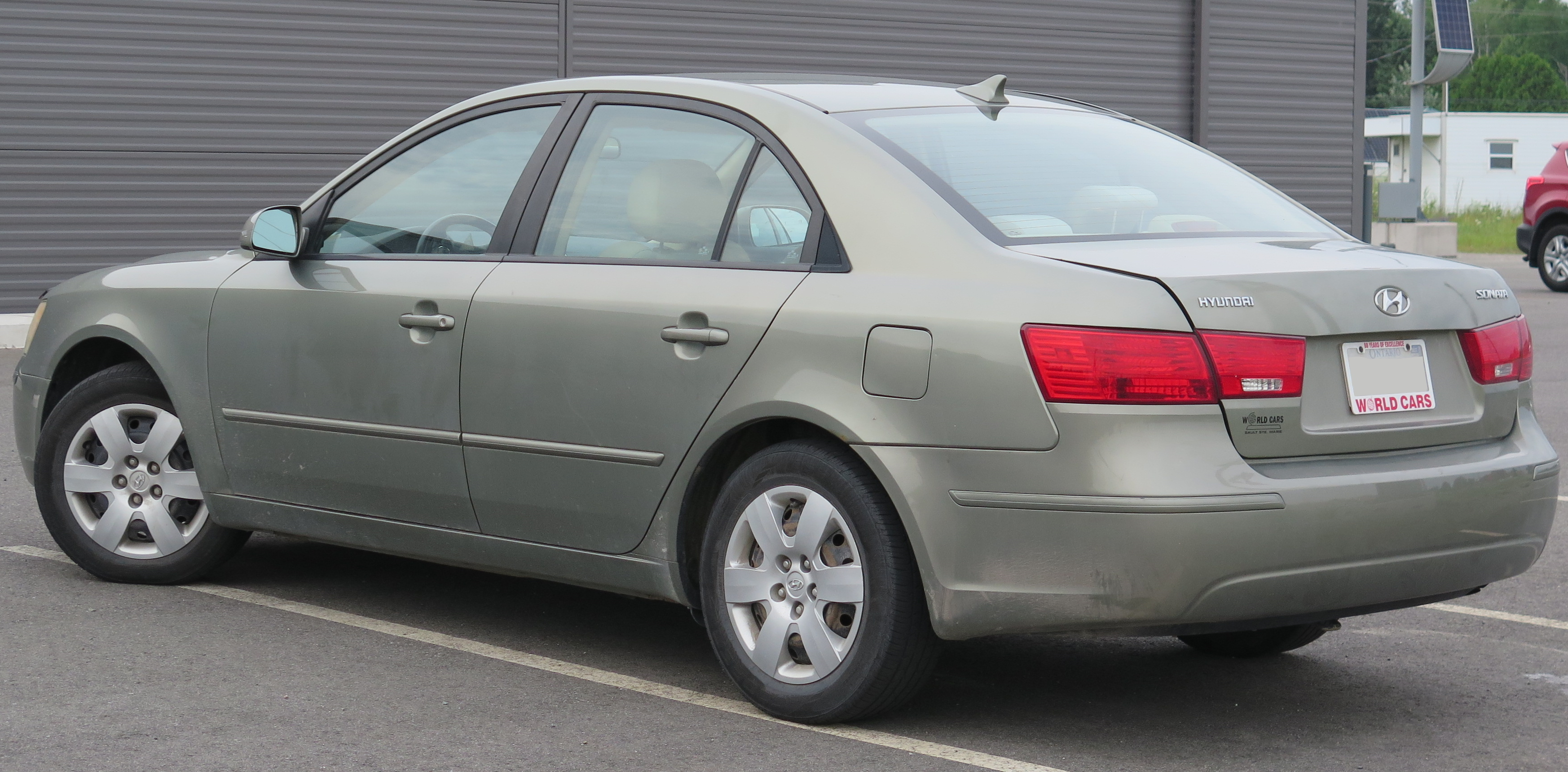
2009 Hyundai Sonata GLS (facelift)

The redesigned vehicle was unveiled at the 2008 Chicago Auto Show as a 2009 model year vehicle. The production version was sold as the Hyundai Sonata Transform in Korea, and the model debuted elsewhere as an 'early' 2009 model.

The styling was done primarily at Hyundai-Kia America Technical Center, Inc. (HATCI) in Superior Township, Michigan in 2006.

The redesign features revised engines, front fascia and chrome 3 bar grille, taillights (turn signals became red in North America only), jewel-projector headlights, new 10-spoke alloy wheel design for the Limited models (as opposed to sharing the 5-spoke design from the SE model), and an extensively revised IP (Instrument Panel). Hyundai adopted "slush molding", a production technique that enables a much higher grade of texturing and shaping of the IP surface.

Redesigned gauges feature a blue backlight, and a touch-screen navigation system, optional on the Limited trim level only, includes satellite radio capability. Bluetooth capability is available as an optional unit, separate from the audio or navigation system, and all models include both a USB port along with an auxiliary input jack. An optional USB adaptor cord allows integration of an iPod, and chrome interior door handles are standard on the Limited trim.

The 2.4-liter G4KE Theta II engine was rated 175 hp (130 kW) at 6000 rpm and 168 lb⋅ft (228 N⋅m) at 4000 rpm, 2.0-liter G4KD Theta II engine was rated 163 hp (122 kW) at 6000 rpm and 145 lb⋅ft (197 N⋅m) at 4250 rpm and the 3.3-liter Lambda V6 was rated 235 hp (175 kW) at 6000 rpm and 229 lb⋅ft (310 N⋅m) at 4500 rpm.

The Diesel engine (D4EA) variant is available for the UK market with the option of 4-speed automatic or 6 speed manual, and was introduced into the Australian market for the first time, replacing the V6 option.

The base model GLS is available with a manual five-speed transmission. GLS, SE and Limited models feature a newly available, manually shiftable five-speed automatic transmission marketed as "Shiftronic".

There are minimal changes for the 2010 model, which includes the optional navigation system on the SE as opposed to being a Limited-exclusive option, and the V6 engine is no longer offered on the GLS model.

=== Sonata Ling Xiang ===
Beijing Hyundai launched a redesigned Sonata called the Ling Xiang, also known as NFC Sonata, for the Chinese market. Production commenced in December 2008 for the 2009 model year. This variant has an updated exterior and revised rear seating. Following Hyundai's success with their Hyundai Elantra Yue Dong, Ling Xiang was created specifically to target the Chinese market. Hyundai first introduced this car to the market at The 6th China Guangzhou International Automobile Exhibition in 2008.

Engine and transmission choices include 2.0-liter and 2.4-liter Theta engines paired to three different gearboxes: a 5-speed manual, a 5-speed automatic, or a 4-speed automatic. Trim levels consisted of the 2.0 GL Manual and Automatic, 2.0 GLS Manual and Automatic, 2.0 DLX AT, 2.0 Top, 2.4 GLS, 2.4DLX AT, and 2.4 Top.

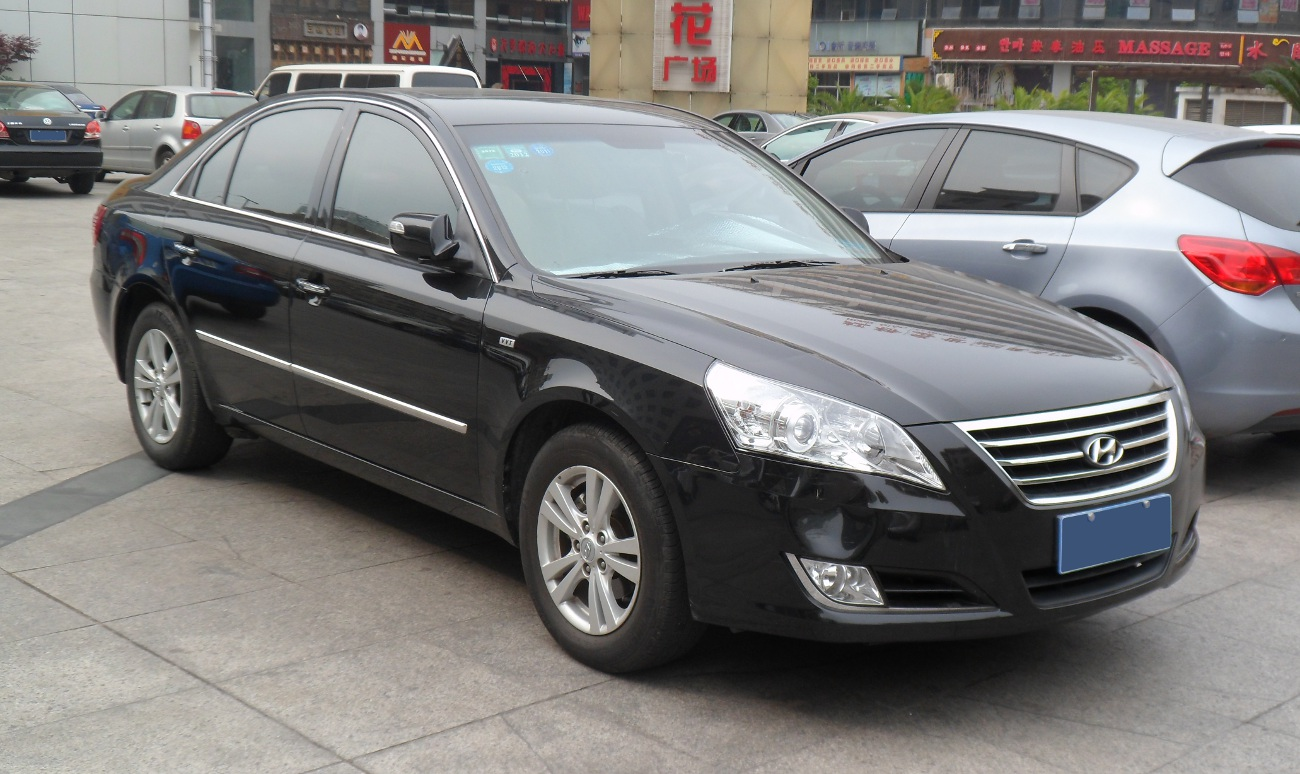
2009–2011 Hyundai Sonata Ling Xiang (China)

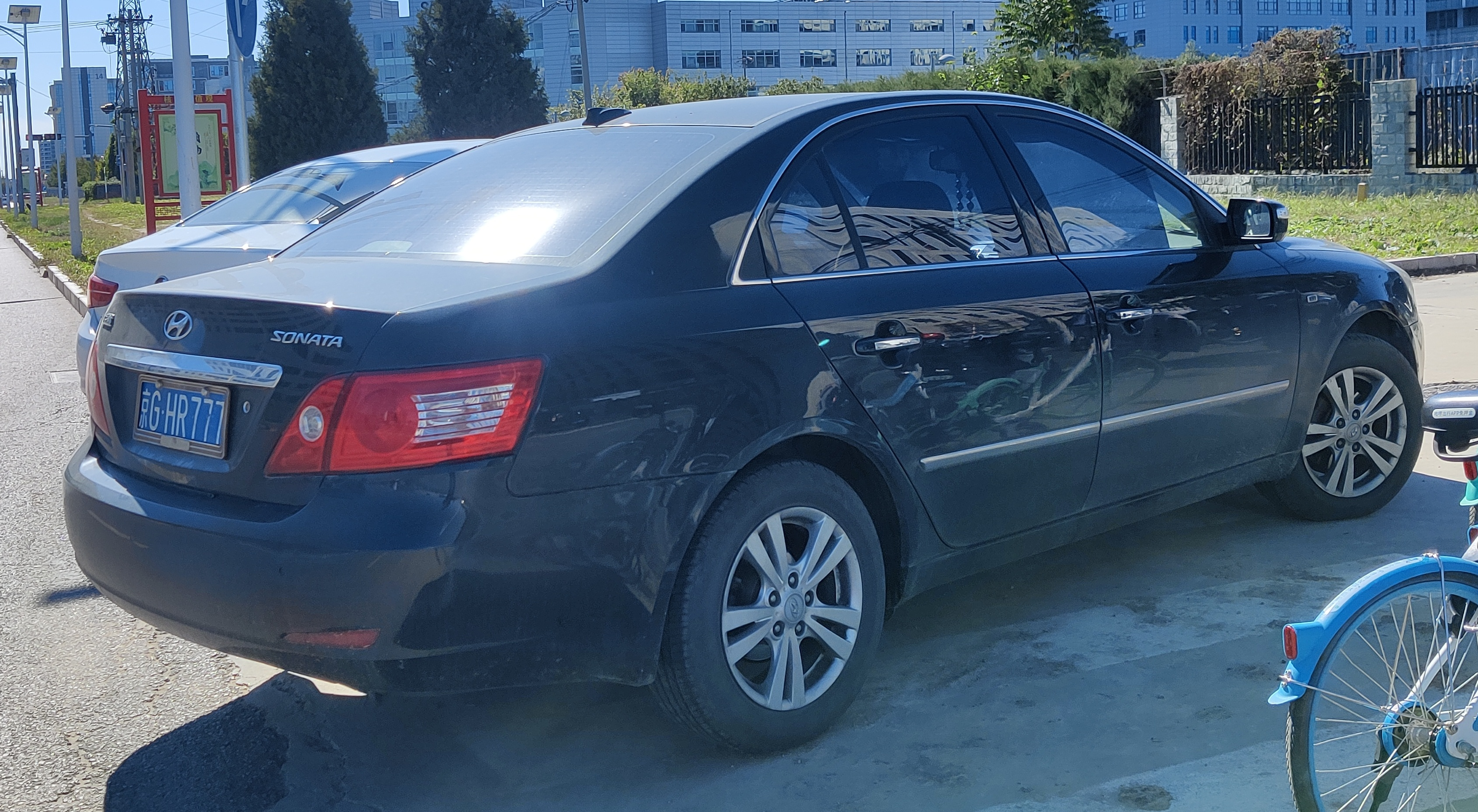
Rear view

== Sixth generation (YF; 2009) ==
Sixth generation
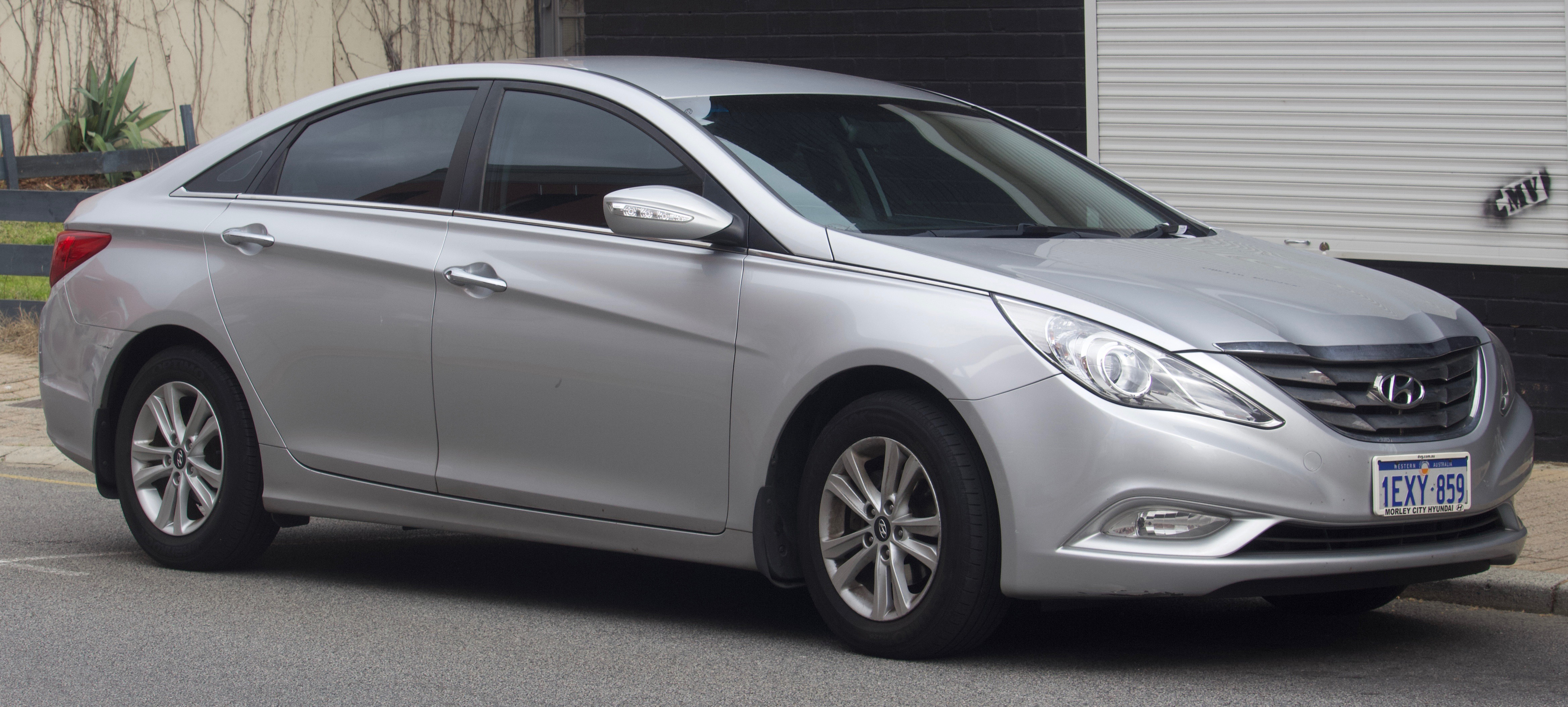
- Hyundai i45 (pre-facelift; Australia)

Overview
- Model code: YF
- Also called: Hyundai i45
- Production: 2009–2014
- Model years: 2010–2014; 2011–2014 (North America); 2011–2015 (China)
- Assembly: South Korea: Asan (Asan Plant); United States: Montgomery, Alabama (HMMA); China: Beijing (Beijing Hyundai)
- Designer: Andre Hudson (2007)

Body and chassis
- Related: Kia Optima/Magentis/K5; Hyundai i40

Powertrain
- Engine: petrol: 2.0 L Nu I4; 2.0 L Theta II I4; 2.0 L Theta II Turbo GDi I4; 2.4 L Theta II I4; 2.4 L Theta II GDi I4; LPG: 2.0 L Nu LPi I4; 2.0 L Theta LPi I4
- Electric motor: 38 kW permanent magnet high-power density motor
- Transmission: 6-speed automatic 6-speed manual
- Battery: Li-ion polymer

Dimensions
- Wheelbase: 2,795 mm (110.0 in)
- Length: 4,820 mm (189.8 in)
- Width: 1,835 mm (72.2 in)
- Height: 1,470 mm (57.9 in)
- Curb weight: 1,451–1,504 kg (3,199–3,316 lb) (2.4L); 1,514–1,566 kg (3,338–3,452 lb) (2.0L Turbo)

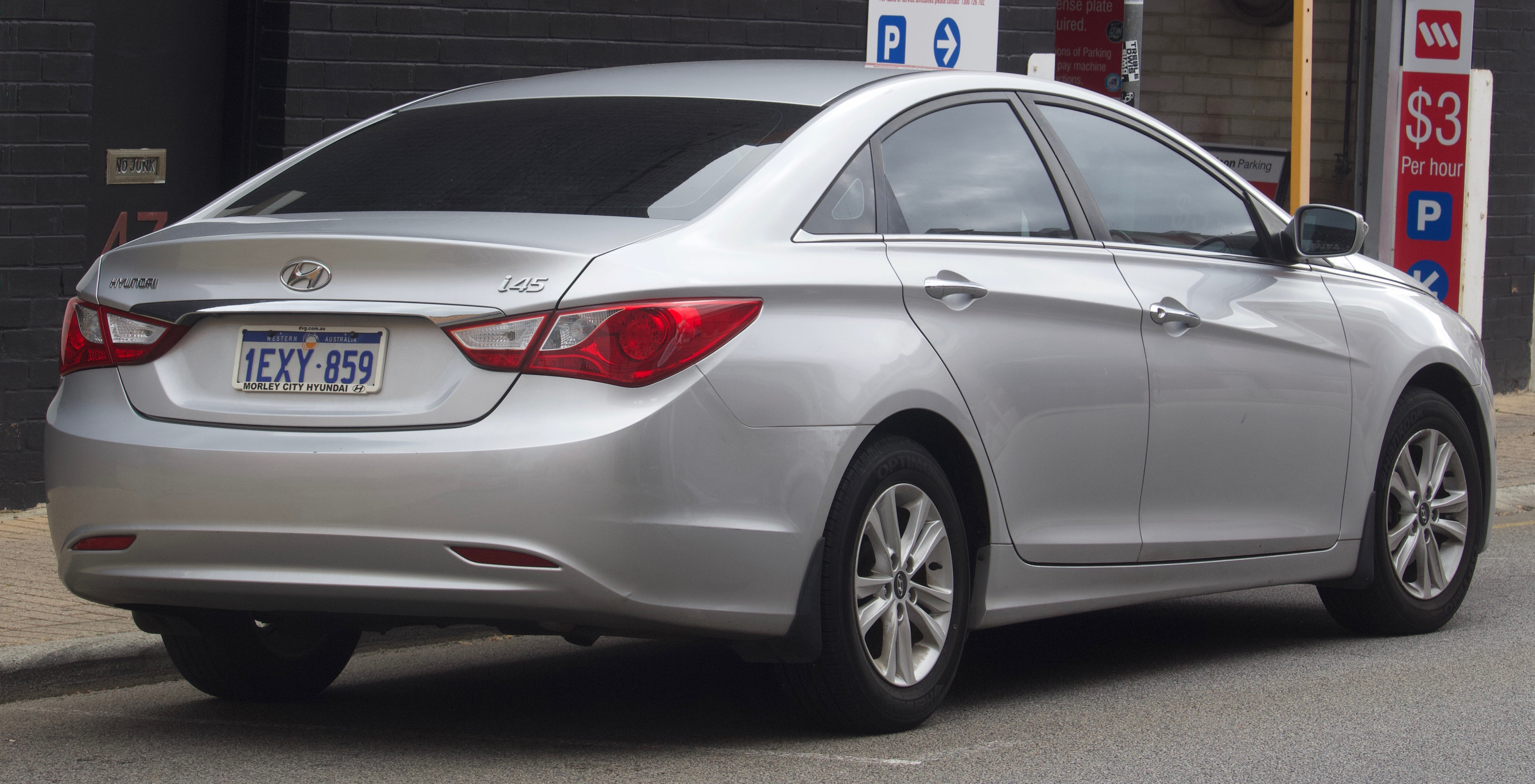
Hyundai i45 (pre-facelift; Australia)

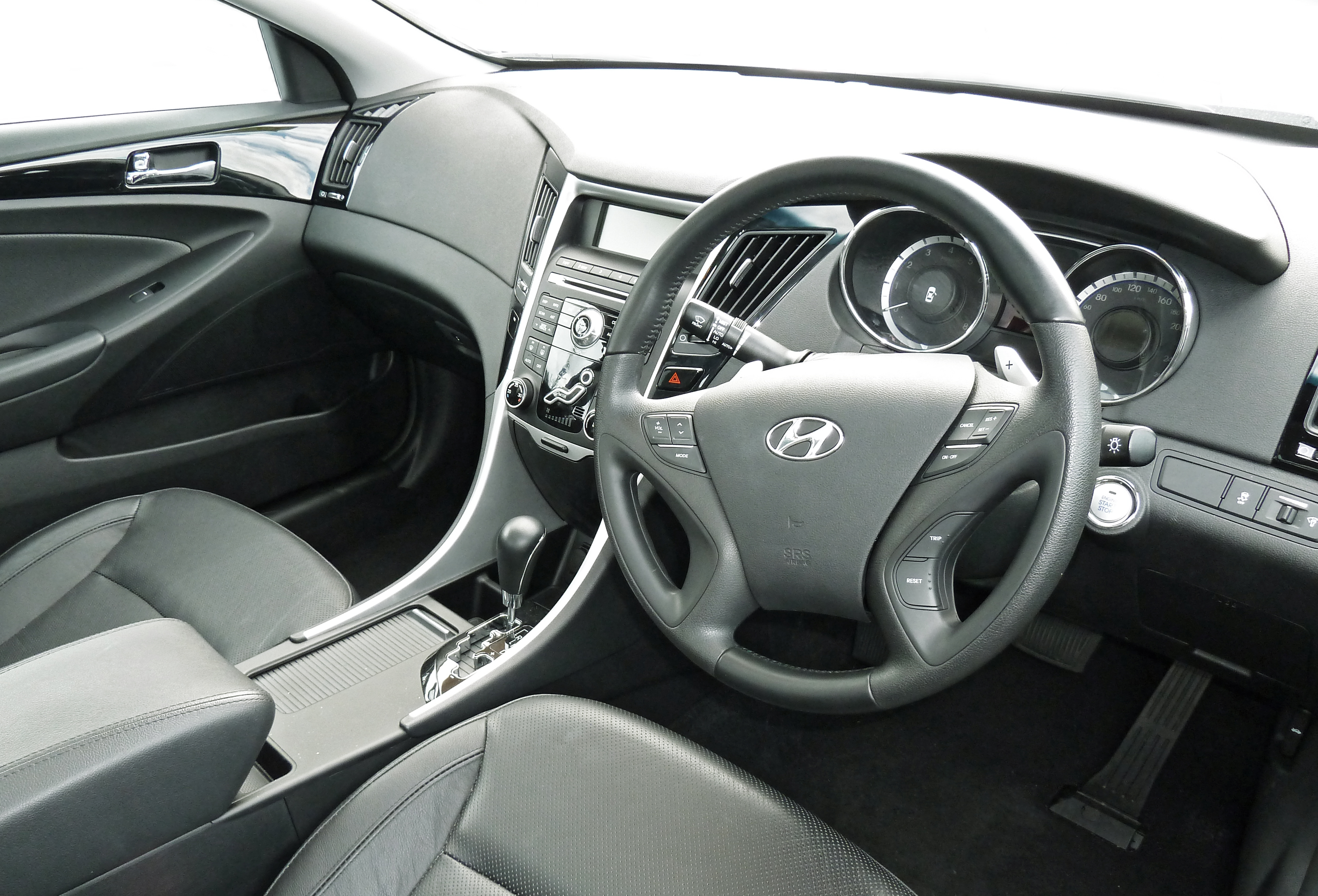
Interior

Hyundai commenced development of the YF Sonata in 2005, with a development cost of ₩450 billion (US$372 million). In the Australian, New Zealand, Singapore, and Colombian markets, the YF is retailed under the name Hyundai i45, following the alphanumeric i-series nomenclature established by Hyundai in these markets. The vehicle was badged as a "Sonata" in Eastern Europe, just as in North America and South Korea.

Sales of the YF Sonata in South Korea began on 2 September 2009, before the production vehicle's South Korean launch. The US version of the sixth generation Sonata was unveiled at the 2009 Los Angeles Auto Show, with sales beginning in 2010 for the 2011 model year. The Sonata was the second vehicle, after the Tucson, to carry Hyundai's then-radical "Fluidic Sculpture" design language.

For the US market, the sixth generation Sonata boasted a direct-injection 2.4-liter four-cylinder engine. This new engine improves fuel economy and produces a maximum of 200 PS (147 kW; 197 hp) at 6300 rpm and 25.5 kg⋅m (250 N⋅m; 184 lb⋅ft) at 4250 rpm. It is part of the Theta II engine lineup. Furthermore, a timing chain was introduced along with a new six-speed automatic transmission. This Sonata is built with hot-stamped ultra high-strength steel. In South Korea, the YF Sonata is delivered with a 2.0-liter Theta II MPi gasoline engine (Max output 165 PS (121 kW; 163 hp), Max torque of 20.2 kg·m). Its fuel economy has improved 11%. A direct-injection 2.4-liter four cylinder engine and a 2.0 turbocharged engine was available.

Exclusive options for the Korean model includes a three-piece panoramic moonroof, electroluminescent instrumentation, fender-mounted turn signals, and a special Premier Beige model. Upgraded audio uses a JBL system, and certain navigation packages come with a telecommunications system with Hyundai's Mozen system.

For the North American model, GLS, SE, and Limited trims were offered. A six-speed manual transmission came standard on the GLS, and a six-speed automatic is available. Differences with the Korean model include differences with the GLS model, which features a body-colored grille and door handles, and different steel wheel covers. Limited models and optional stereos on the GLS and SE now have "Dimension" audio systems, and the Limited trim has an optional Infinity stereo. Limited models have standard front and rear heated seats, the first such offering in this segment. Additional differences include different cupholders, a redesigned straight leather shifter as rather than the gated one on Korean models, and an additional exterior color choice, Indigo Blue Pearl. The 6th generation Sonata was awarded Top Safety Pick from Insurance Institute for Highway Safety (IIHS) in the United States. The Sonata 2.0T was released in December 2010.

For the 2012 model year, Hyundai's new Blue Link system was offered as standard equipment, and the Limited model included a new standard three-piece panoramic sunroof. SE models had an optional backup camera included with navigation packages, and navigation systems included a new 7-inch display from the previous 6.5-inch.

For 2013, the list of standard features was changed slightly, including heated front seats on SE models, and heated rear seats on Limited models. An automatic transmission also came standard on GLS models, the manual was no longer offered. The GLS Popular Equipment Package now included fog lights and heated front seats. The Limited trims now no longer included the panoramic sunroof, but instead included a standard size sunroof. A panoramic sunroof offered on the Limited Premium Package.

In January 2013 the i45 was discontinued in Australia following slow sales and limited supplies. In turn, the expanded i40 range filled the gap left by the i45. The i45 has also been discontinued in Colombia, and replaced with the smaller i40 sedan, leaving Singapore and New Zealand as the only two markets still selling the vehicle under the i45 name at that time.

=== Facelift (2012–2014) ===
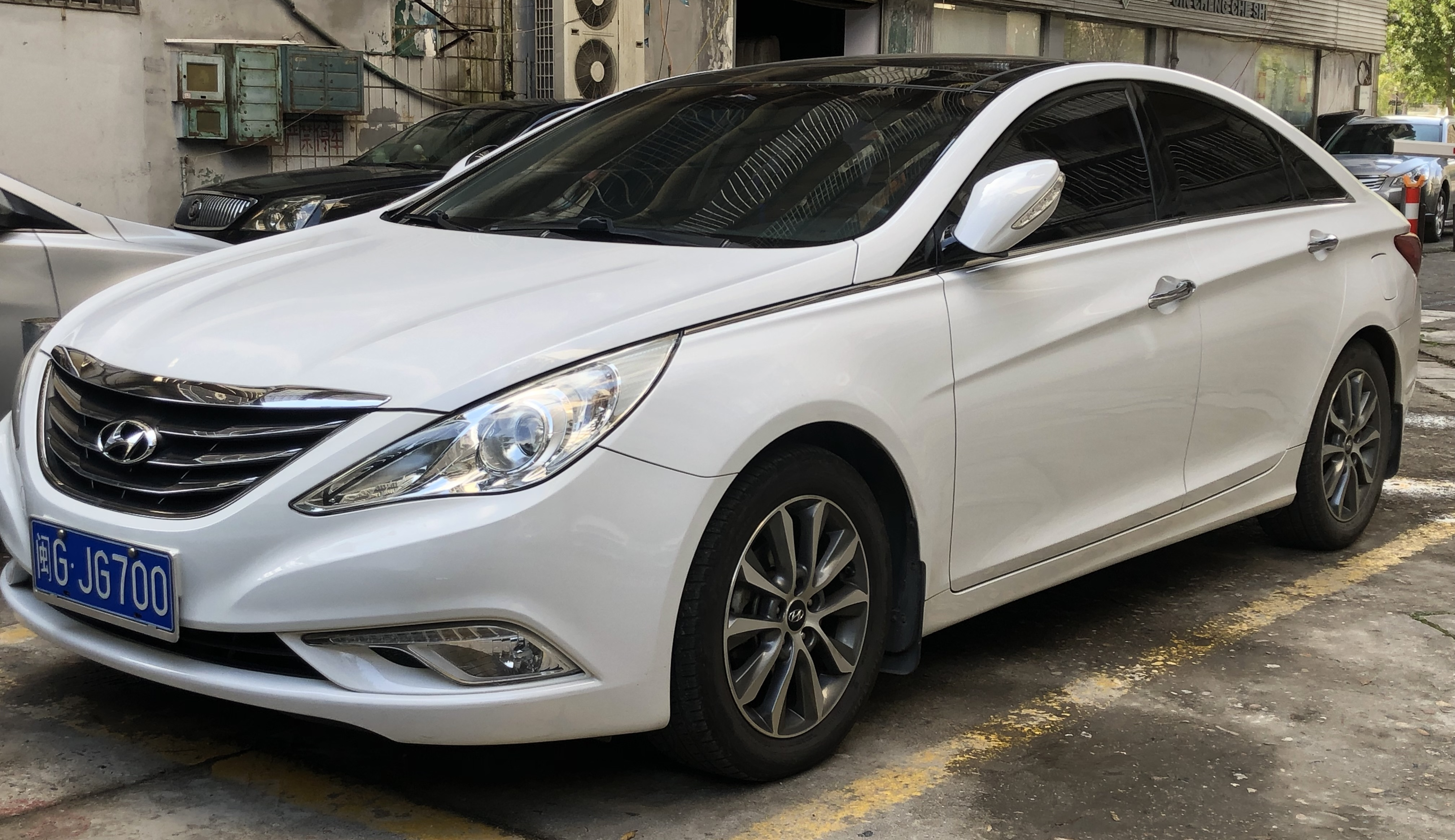

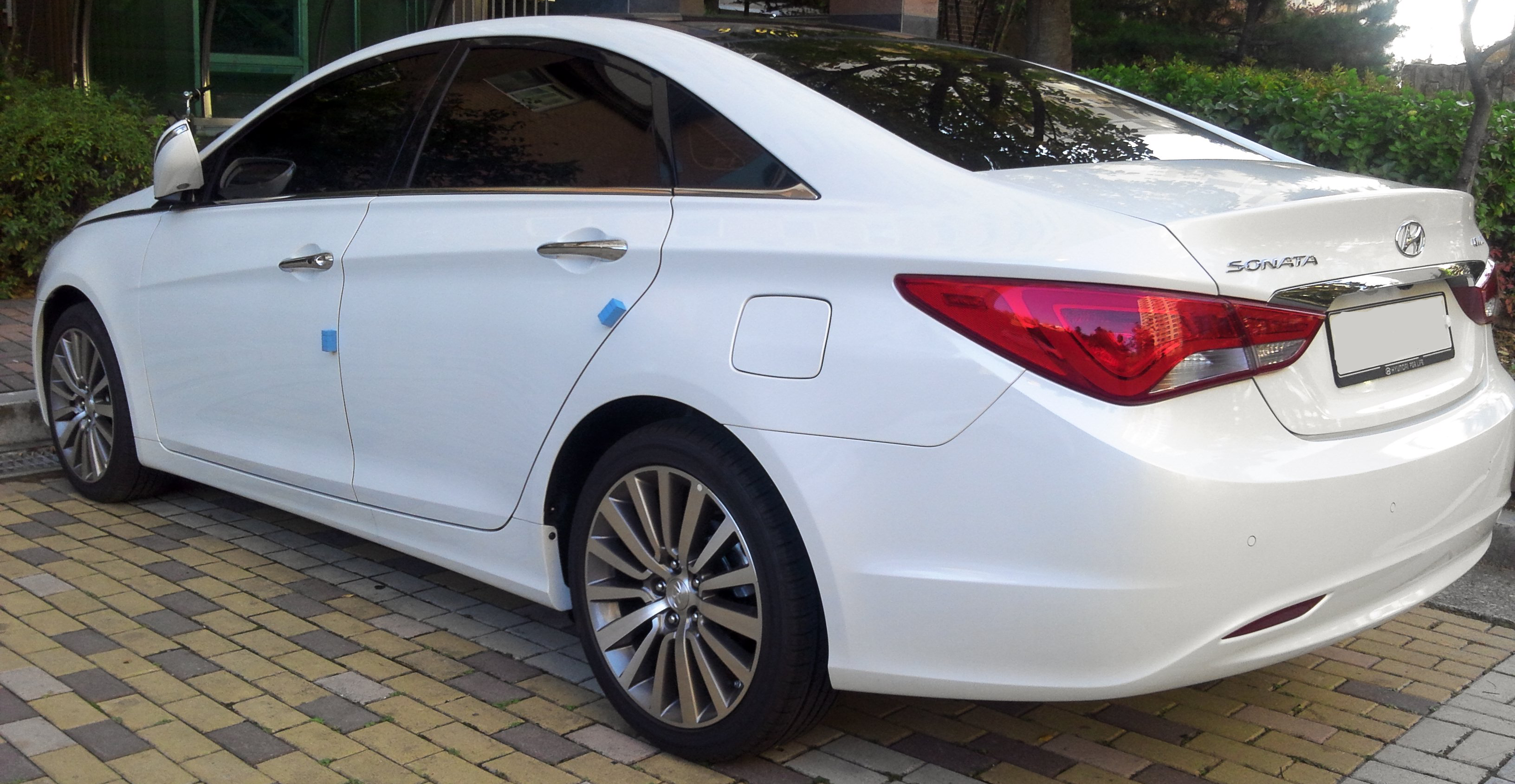
Facelift

In 2012, the Korean-produced Sonata received a mild mid-life facelift. Exterior changes include a new grille, slimmer LED mirror indicators, new front fog lights incorporating LED daytime running lamps (DRLs), new alloy wheel designs, as well as redesigned LED taillights. Interior changes include a new color touchscreen display for audio systems (on certain models), as well as redesigned dual-zone automatic climate controls, which now incorporate a small liquid-crystal display. A Driver Selectable Steering Mode was standard on all trims. Front parking sensors are now available on certain models, as well as an electronic parking brake. The facelifted model was first released in Korea in 2012, followed by international markets in early 2013. North American produced Sonatas received a facelift in late 2013, for the 2014 model year.

=== Safety ===
Top Safety Pick Award in Insurance Institute for Highway Safety tests

- Frontal impact crash test: "Good"
- Side impact crash test: "Good"
- Rear crash protection: "Good"
- Roof strength evaluation: "Good"

Later release (manufactured on or after 2 July 2010) version of Model Year 2011: by the U.S. National Highway Traffic Safety Administration (NHTSA) under 2010 new test rules
The 2011 Sonata is one of six vehicles rated Five Star under new rules as of November 2010.

- Overall Frontal Rating:
- Frontal Rating (Driver):
- Frontal Rating (Passenger):
- Side Overall Rating (Front):
- Side Overall Rating (Rear):
- Side Barrier Rating (Front):
- Side Barrier Rating (Rear):
- Side Pole Rating (Driver):
- Rollover:

Early release (manufactured before 2 July 2010) version of model year 2011:

- Overall Frontal Rating:
- Frontal Rating (Driver):
- Frontal Rating (Passenger):
- Side Overall Rating (Front):
- Side Overall Rating (Rear):
- Side Barrier Rating (Front):
- Side Barrier Rating (Rear):
- Side Pole Rating (Driver):
- Rollover:

Australasian NCAP – The Hyundai Sonata scored the highest possible rating of 5 stars "ANCAP Safety ratings: 2011 Hyundai Sonata". ANCAP.

ANCAP test results* Hyundai i45 all variants (2013)
Test	Score
Overall	5 /5 stars
Frontal offset	14.57/16
Side impact	14.96/16
Pole	2/2
Seat belt reminders	2/3
Whiplash protection	Pending
Pedestrian protection	Marginal
Electronic stability control	Standard

Korean NCAP – The Hyundai Sonata scored the highest possible ratings across the frontal, offset and side crash tests "KNCAP Safety ratings: 2011 Hyundai Sonata". KNCAP.

China NCAP – The Hyundai Sonata scored the highest possible rating of 6 stars "CNCAP Safety ratings: 2011 Hyundai Sonata". CNCAP.

=== Sonata Hybrid ===
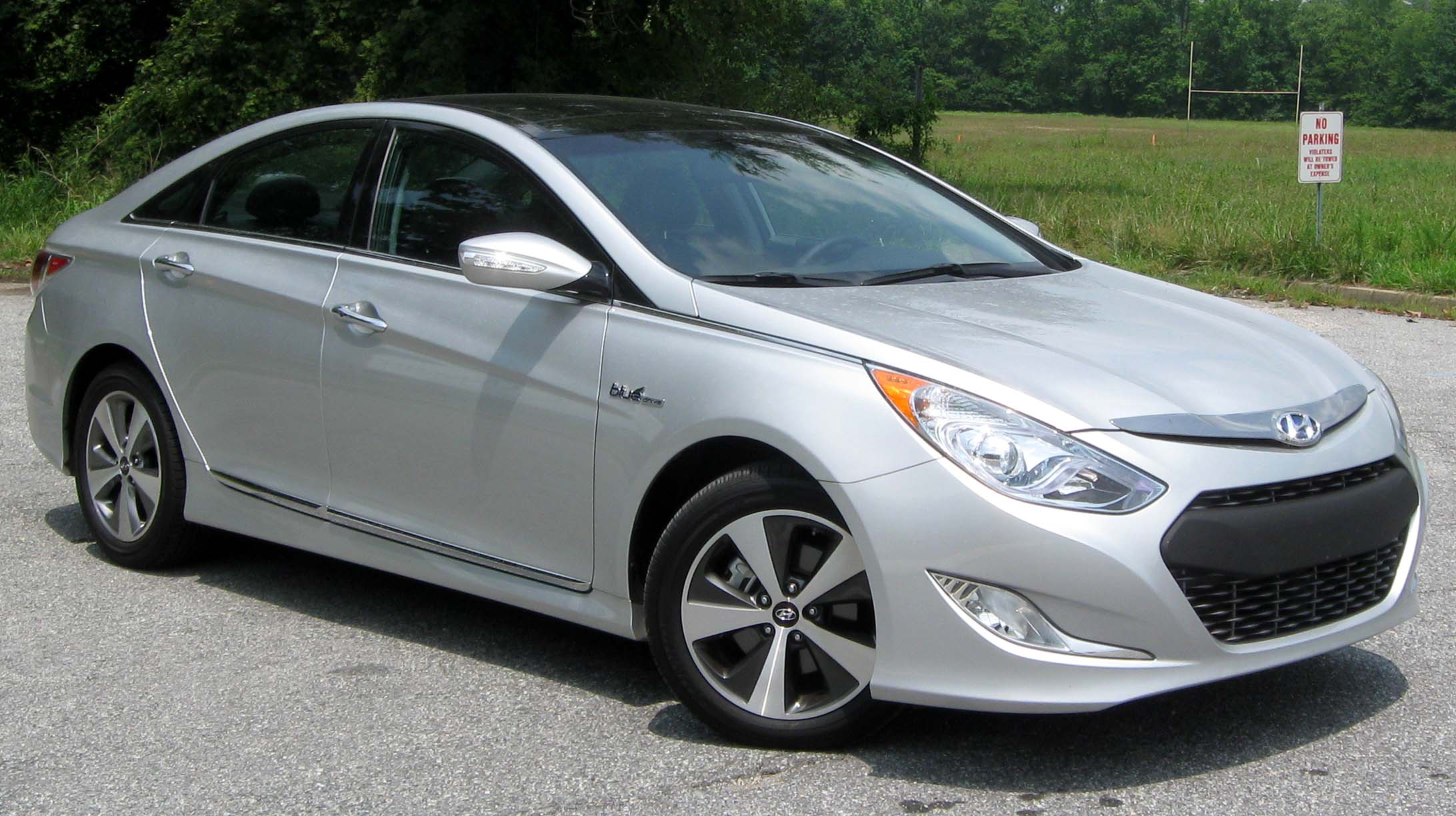
2012 Hyundai Sonata Hybrid (US)

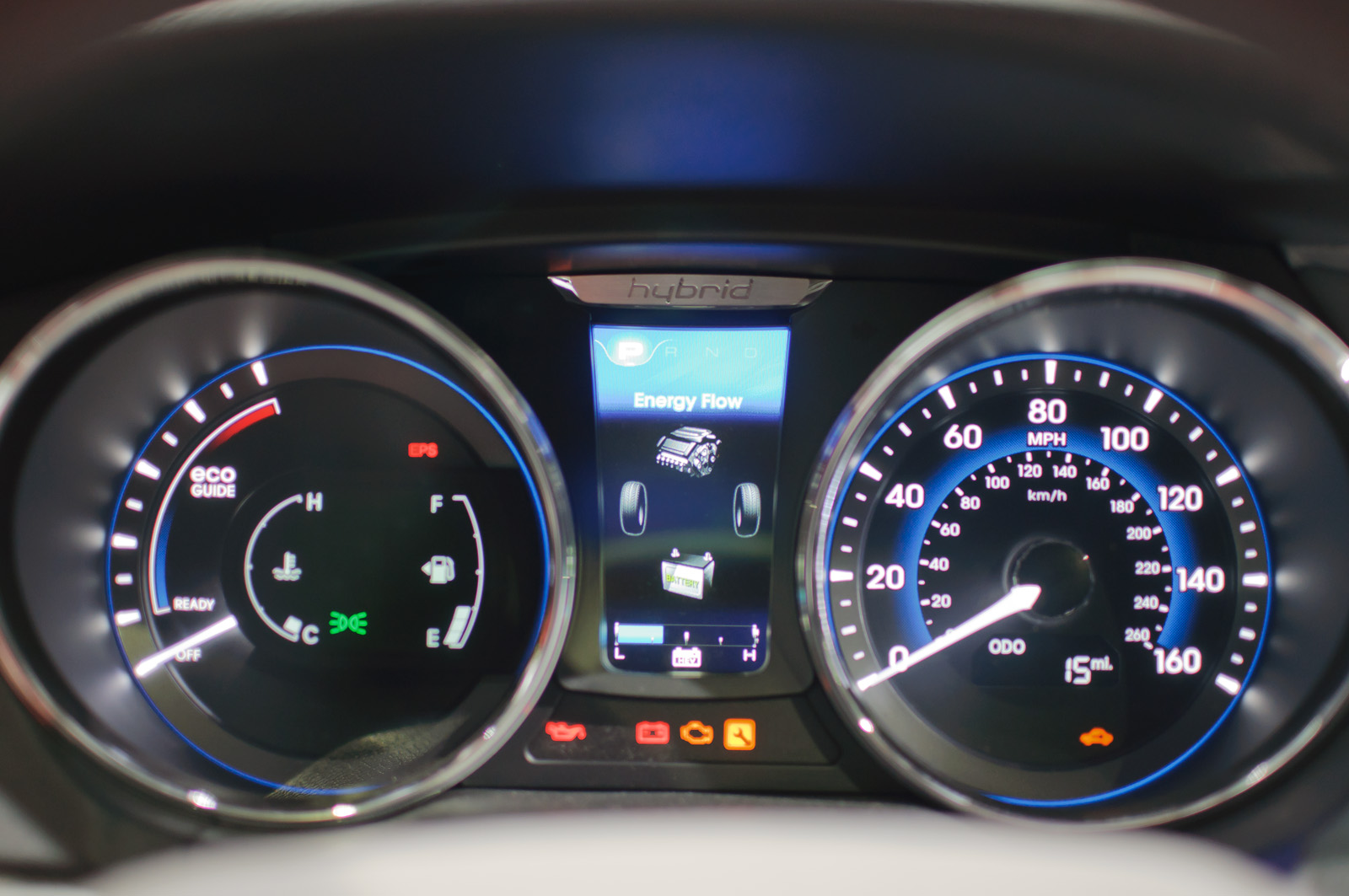
Instrument panel of the Sonata Hybrid

At the 2008 Los Angeles Auto Show, Hyundai unveiled the Hyundai Blue Drive powertrain for the then next generation Sonata, which uses lithium polymer battery technology. It was reported to be based on Hyundai BLUE-DRIVE concept.

The 2011 Hyundai Sonata Hybrid sales in the U.S. began near the end of February 2011. The Sonata Hybrid drivetrain combines a 2.4-liter engine with six-speed automatic transmission, and a 30 kW electric motor and lightweight lithium polymer batteries to produce a full gasoline-electric hybrid with 37 miles per US gallon (6.4 L/100 km; 44 mpg_{‑imp}) in the city and 40 miles per US gallon (5.9 L/100 km; 48 mpg_{‑imp}) on the highway. This powertrain is shared with the 2011 Kia Optima Hybrid; and 2013 Sonata Hybrid.

==== Overview ====
The 2013 Sonata Hybrid has noticeable improvements and has ranked 3rd out of 20 Affordable Midsize Cars (based on U.S. News' analysis of 19 published reviews and test drives as well as their analysis of reliability and safety data). The 2013 hybrid has a long warranty and a spacious, high-quality interior. Its base price ranges from $26,445–$31,324 and weights 3450–3550 pounds. As a hybrid, it emits 0.51 pounds of CO_{2} per mile and has an EPA fuel economy ratings of 36/40 mpg city/highway.

Cumulative sales of the Sonata Hybrid in the U.S. reached 7,906 units through July 2011, representing 20 percent of Sonata sales at the time, according to Hyundai. The Sonata Hybrid was the number two selling hybrid since June, outsold only by the Prius. Considering cumulative sales in the U.S. market through December 2011, with 19,672 units sold, the Sonata Hybrid and the Kia Optima Hybrid together ranked second in hybrid sales for calendar year 2011, after the Toyota Prius, and surpassed the Honda Insight in September.

==== Specifications ====
It comes with a 35 kW electric motor (up from 30) and a lithium-polymer battery that is 38 percent larger and more energy dense. The newer electric motor can run up to 62 mph (100 km/h), meaning that it can run on electricity at higher speeds, saving more fuel. It also retains the 2.4-liter, multi-port fuel injected, four-cylinder engine, which uses a modified Atkinson cycle achieved via VVT and a compression ratio of 13:1. Upgraded computer programming smooths the transitions between gas and electric power modes. The hybrid's 0 to 60 mph (0 to 97 km/h) time decreased from 9.5 to 8.1 seconds (note: the non-hybrid Sonata's time is 7.9).

Standard features include Bluetooth, Satellite radio, dual-zone climate control, auxiliary and USB jacks, a CD Player, six-speaker surround system, 16-inch alloy wheels, automatic headlights, LED running lights, fog lights, heated mirrors, keyless ignition/entry, push-button start, cruise control, an eight-way power driver seat, tilt-and-telescoping steering wheel, heated front seats, and Hyundai's BlueLink emergency communications system. Additional options include touchscreen navigation, a rearview camera, panoramic sunroof, HD radio, Infinity audio system (nine speakers), 17-inch alloy wheels, leather seating surfaces, leather-wrapped steering wheel and shift knob, power driver seat with lumbar support, heated rear seat, auto-dimming rearview mirror.

==== Safety ====
The hybrid Sonata received top five-star ratings for overall crash protection and overall side protection as well as four-ratings for overall frontal protection. Safety features include antilock brakes, stability control, traction control, front side-impact airbags, full-length curtain airbags, and active front head restraints.

=== Sonata Turbo ===
To replace the V6 power option for the Hyundai Sonata in certain markets, Hyundai developed a turbo-powered 2.0-liter engine that has direct injection and is intercooled. The Theta-II engine produces 274 horsepower (204 kW) and 269 lb⋅ft (365 N⋅m) of torque while achieving an efficiency rating of 34 mpg_{‑US} (6.9 L/100 km; 41 mpg_{‑imp}) highway, beating the specs provided by the 3.3-liter Lambda V6 offered in the previous model. The new model was badged as the 2.0T and is available on the SE or Limited trim lines. All turbo models received standard dual zone climate control, steering wheel paddle shifters, chrome-tipped dual exhaust, and 18-inch wheels that are shared with the non-turbo SE models. Limited 2.0T models received all of these options as well as a heated leather interior, sunroof and other features.

== Seventh generation (LF; 2014) ==
Seventh generation
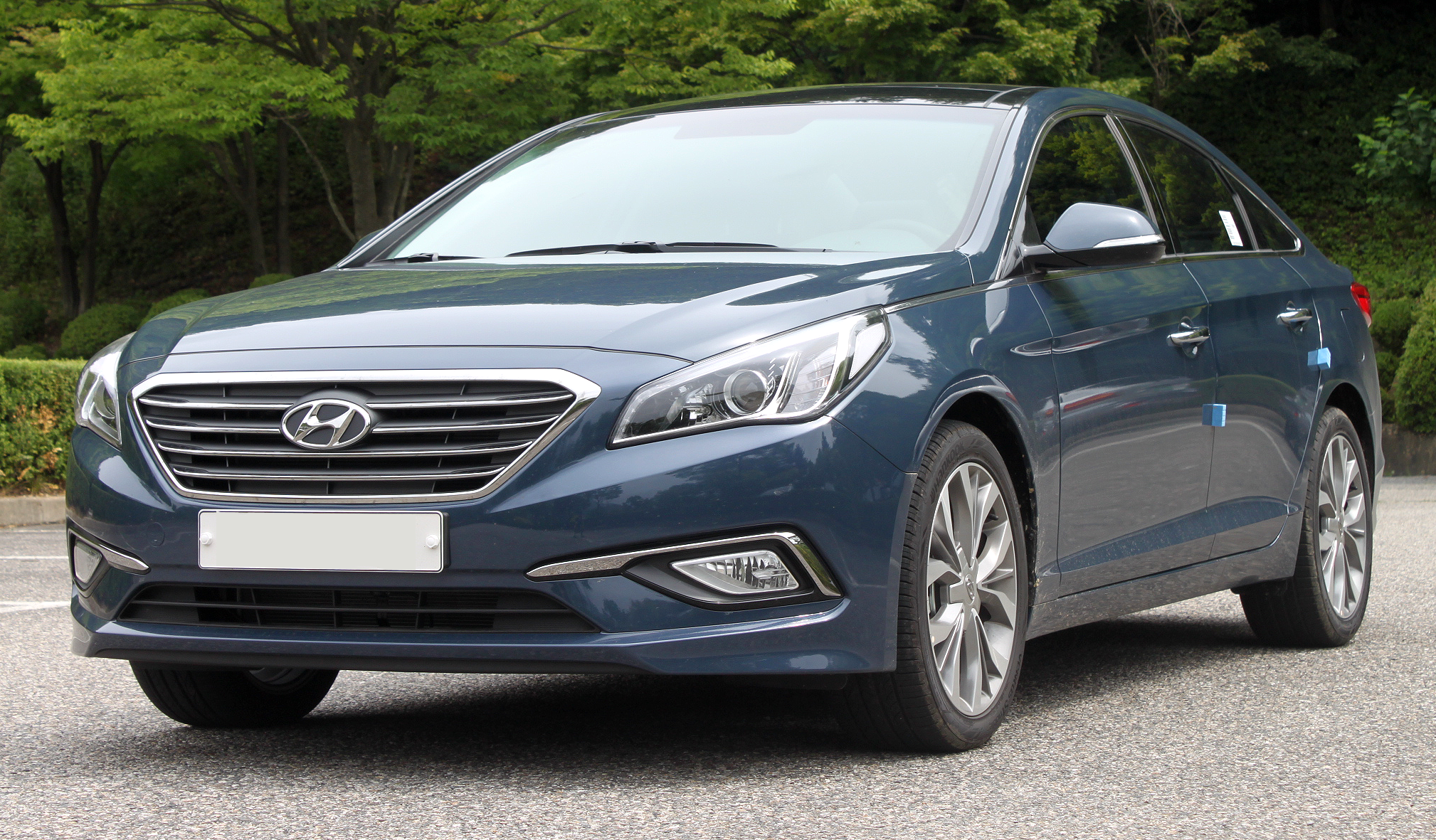
- Pre-facelift

Overview
- Model code: LF
- Production: 2014–2023; 2015–2020 (China); 2018–2020 (Russia)
- Model years: 2015–2019
- Assembly: South Korea: Asan (Asan Plant); United States: Montgomery, Alabama (HMMA); China: Beijing (Beijing Hyundai); Russia: Kaliningrad (Avtotor)
- Designer: Tae-Hoon Kim (2011)

Body and chassis
- Platform: Hyundai-Kia N1/N2
- Related: Kia Optima (JF)

Powertrain
- Engine: Gasoline: 1.6 L Gamma T-GDi I4; 2.0 L Nu MPi I4; 2.0 L Theta II T-GDi I4; 2.4 L Theta II MPi I4; 2.4 L Theta II GDi I4; Hybrid: 2.0 L Nu GDI I4; Gasoline/LPG: 2.0 L Nu LPi I4; Diesel: 1.7 L U II CRDi I4
- Transmission: 6-speed manual 6-speed automatic 8-speed automatic 7-speed dual-clutch automatic

Dimensions
- Wheelbase: 2,805 mm (110.4 in)
- Length: 4,855 mm (191.1 in)
- Width: 1,865 mm (73.4 in)
- Height: 1,475 mm (58.1 in)
- Curb weight: 1,435–1,640 kg (3,164–3,616 lb)

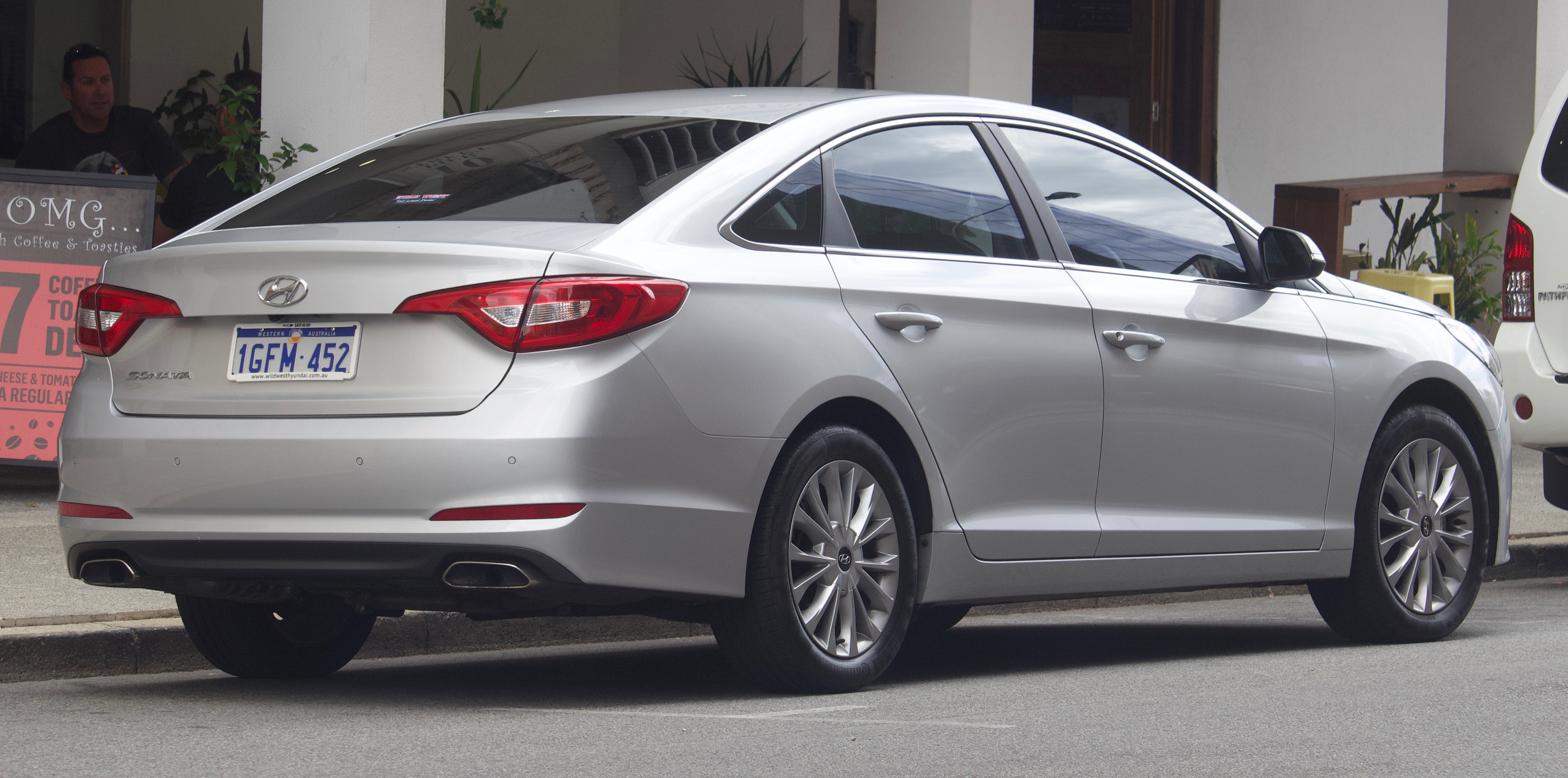
2017 Hyundai Sonata (pre-facelift; Australia)

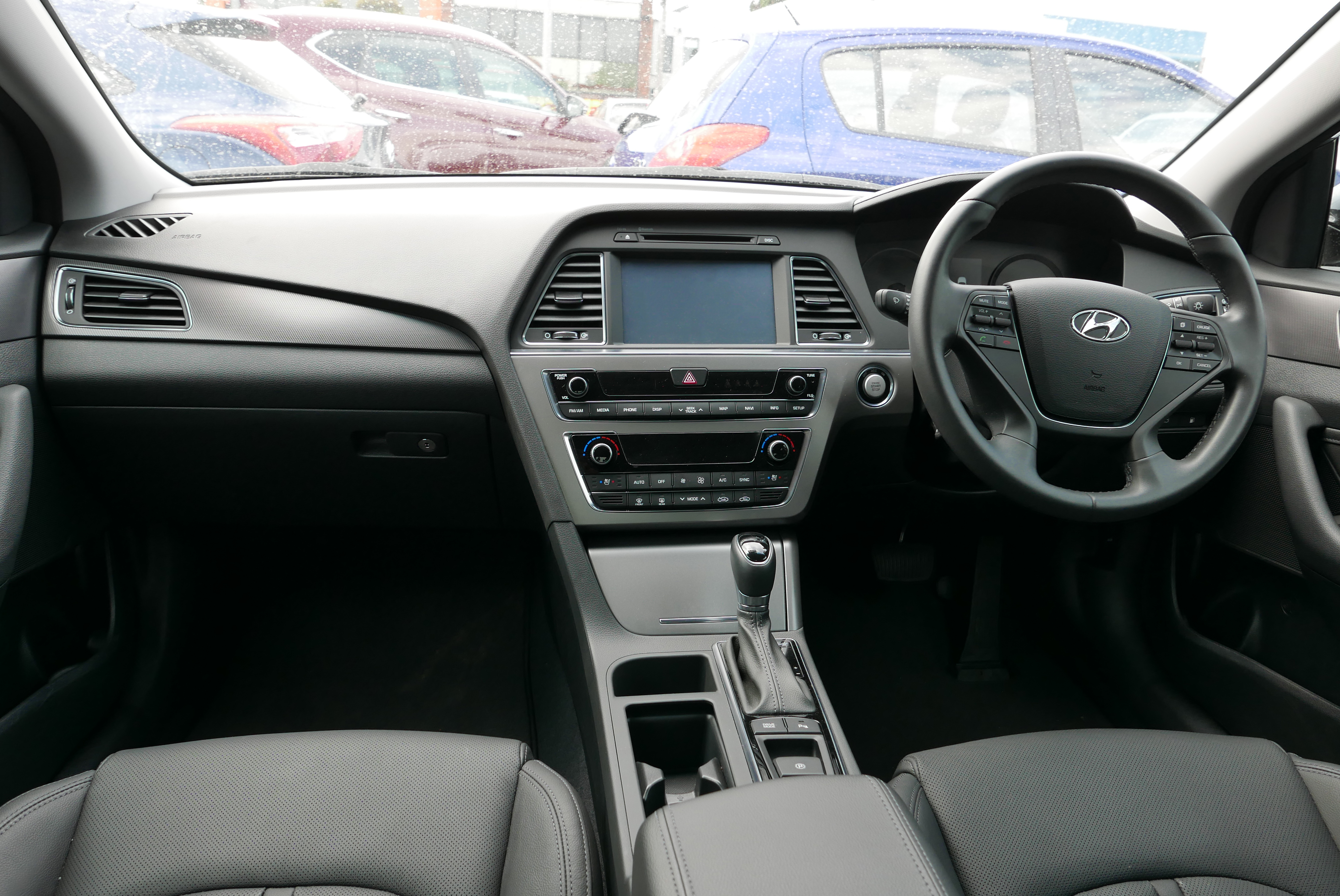
Interior

Originally internally coded as LFA, the 2015 Sonata was unveiled in South Korea on March 24, 2014. It made its North American debut at the 2014 New York International Auto Show. While the previous model incorporated significant aesthetic changes and sold successfully within the U.S., sales in Korea failed to meet expectations. A more conservative approach was thus taken, to appease the Korean market, resulting in Fluidic Sculpture 2.0. The car inherits many styling features from Hyundai's Hyundai HCD-14 Concept unveiled at the 2013 New York International Auto Show. The car also takes interior and exterior styling based on the 2014 Hyundai Aslan. In Australia and New Zealand, Hyundai have reverted to the use of the Sonata badge, replacing the i45 badge that was used only on the sixth generation Sonata in that market. Some cars had to be recalled in South Korea because of manufacturing defects that affected safety.

=== North America ===
In the United States, the 2015 Sonata was available in base SE, economy-minded Eco, midlevel Sport, and range-topping Limited trim levels. All 2015 Sonatas (except for the Eco) were powered by a 2.4L gasoline direct injection (GDi) inline-4 (I4) gasoline engine mated to a six-speed automatic transmission. The Eco trim was powered by a 1.6L turbocharged inline-4 (I4) gasoline engine paired with a seven-speed dual clutch (DCT) automatic transmission. Available on Sport and Limited trims was a 2.0L turbocharged inline-4 (I4) gasoline engine paired with a six-speed automatic transmission. All 2015 Sonatas were only available with front wheel drive (FWD). The Sonata Hybrid did not debut until the 2016 model year, as the 2015 Sonata Hybrid was a carryover model from the 2014 model year.

All models of the 2015 Sonata were equipped with features such as an A/M-F/M radio with SiriusXM Satellite Radio, Bluetooth for hands-free calling and wireless stereo audio streaming via A2DP and USB and auxiliary audio inputs, a six-speaker audio system, steering wheel-mounted audio system and Bluetooth phone controls, a digital clock, power windows and door locks, aluminum-alloy wheels, a remote trunk release, a color LCD driver information center in the instrument cluster, a tilt-adjustable steering wheel, air conditioning, and a split-folding rear bench seat. Most trim levels also featured a color LCD touchscreen audio system, a rearview backup camera system, a keyless access system with push-button start, carpeted floor mats, the Hyundai Blue Link in-vehicle telematics system, a leather-wrapped steering wheel, heated front seats, a power-adjustable front driver's seat, and wood or aluminum interior trim.

=== Facelift (2017) ===
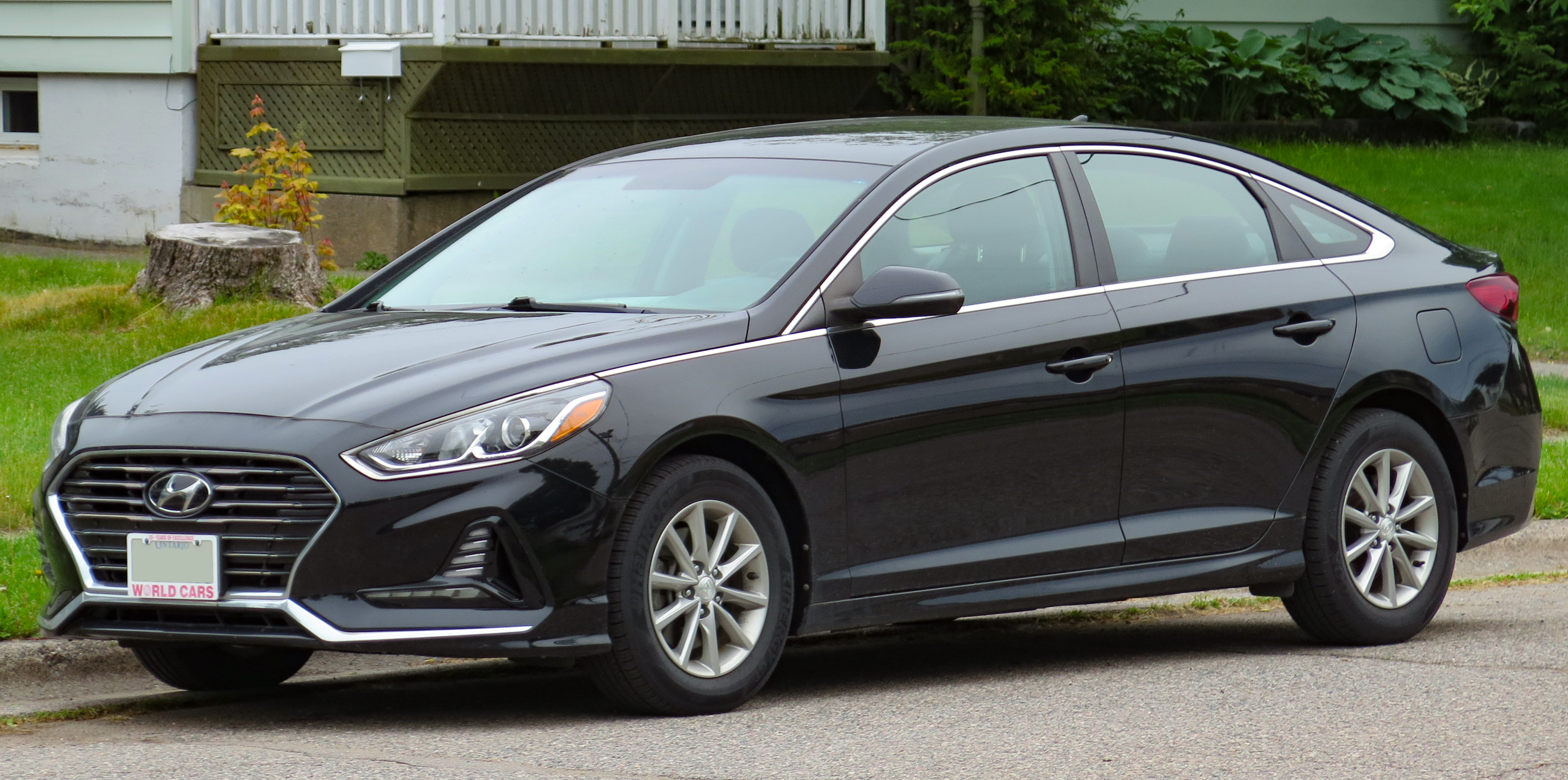

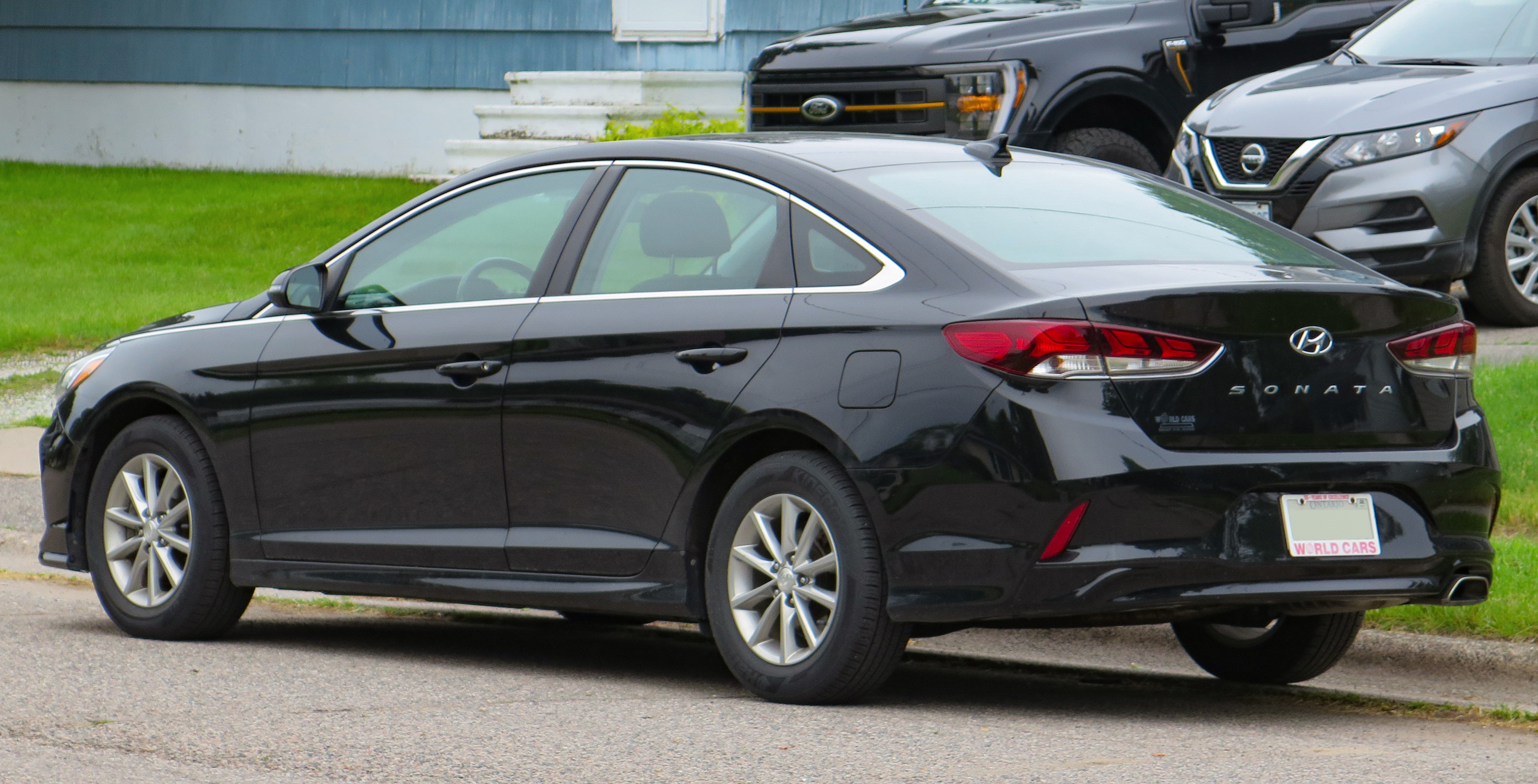
2018 Hyundai Sonata GL (facelift; Canada)

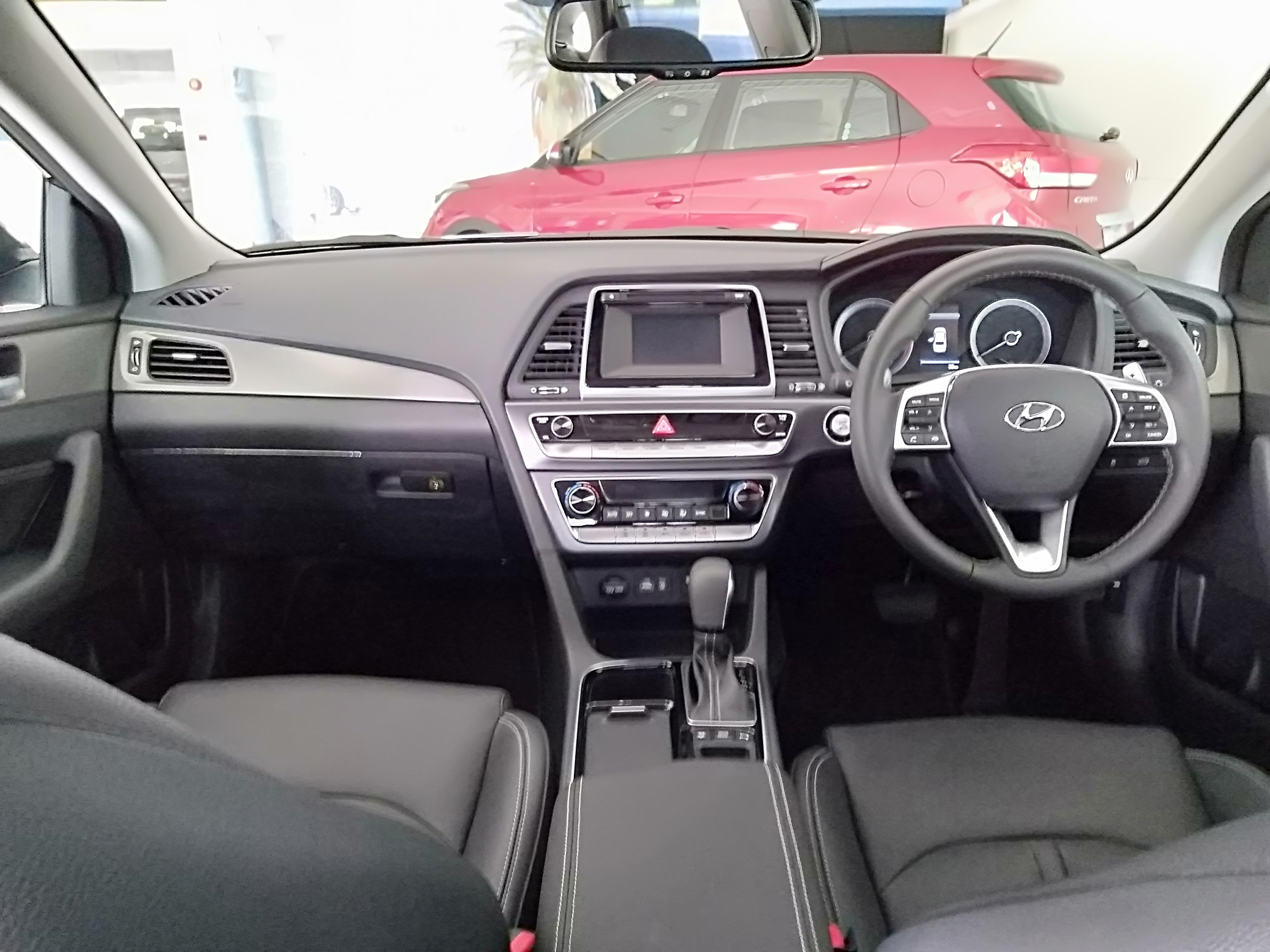
Interior

A facelifted seventh-generation Sonata was unveiled on March 8, 2017. Korean name is 'Sonata New Rise'. The exterior received a radical redesign more in line with the sixth-generation, including new headlights, tail lights, cascading grille, and optional vertical LED lighting. The front of the 2018 Sonata shares some characteristics of the sixth generation Grandeur/Azera. The dashboard was reshaped, with new air vents on the driver's side and a larger touch screen that is compatible with Apple CarPlay and Android Auto. The interior also received a new steering wheel, gearshift, and instrument cluster. Other standard features added in the refresh include standard wireless phone charger and USB port for rear passengers. The Hyundai Blue Link telematics system was also upgraded to be compatible with Amazon Echo and Google Home devices.

A mid-trim SEL trim level was also added for 2018, with standard features such as Hyundai Blue Link in-vehicle telematics system, SiriusXM Satellite Radio, A/M-F/M HD Radio, and a power-adjustable front driver's bucket seat also became available for 2018, and both the base SE and Eco trims lost those features as standard equipment.

=== Sonata Plug-in Hybrid ===
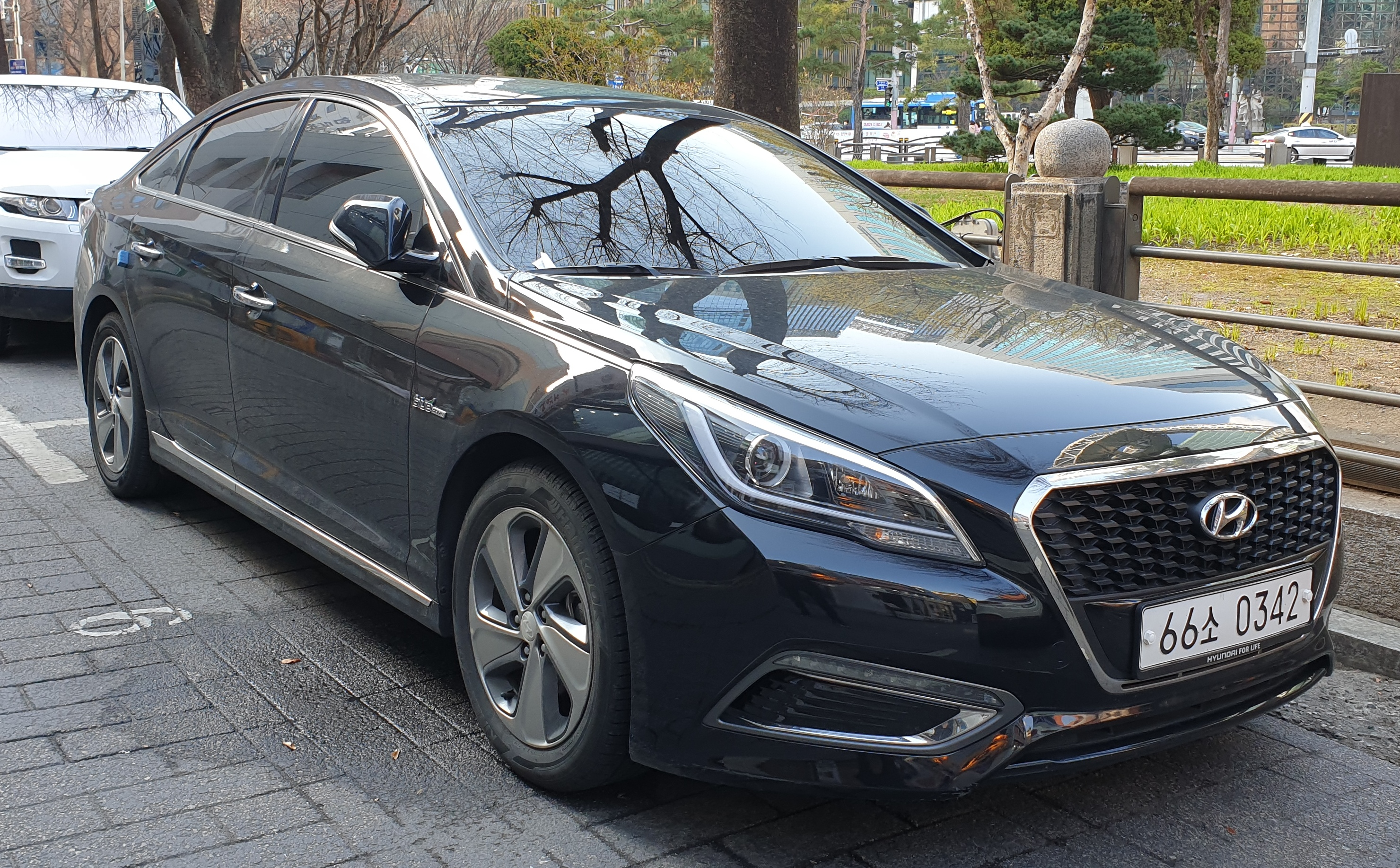

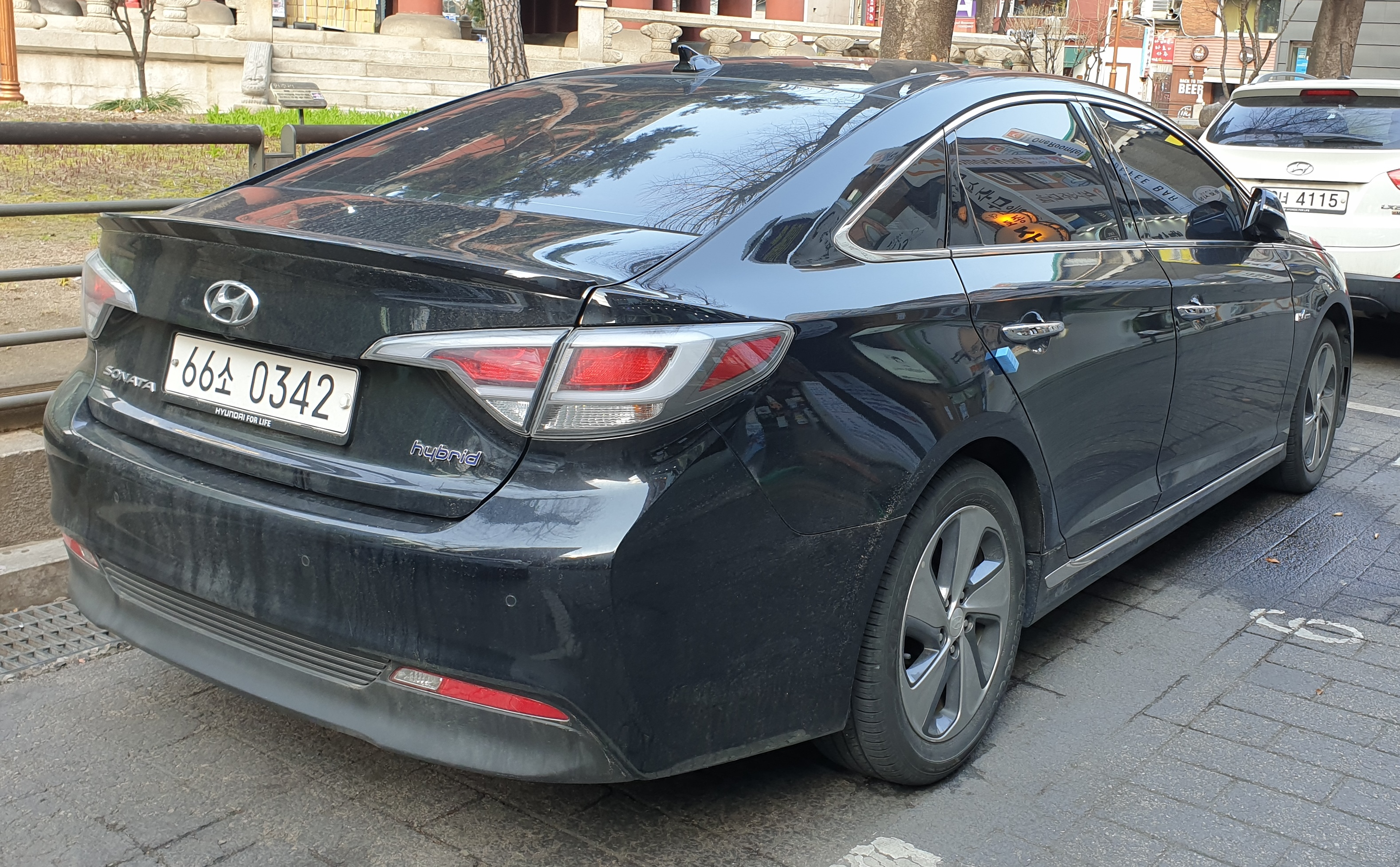
Sonata Plug-in Hybrid

As part of the seventh-generation Sonata, Hyundai announced the release of a plug-in hybrid variant scheduled for market launch in the second half of 2015. Technical details of the Sonata PHEV were announced at the 2015 North American International Auto Show. The Sonata PHEV was released in selected markets in the United States in November 2015. It is available only in California and nine other states that share the same zero-emissions vehicle requirements as California.

The Sonata plug-in all-electric range in blended mode is up to 27 mi (43 km) as rated by the United States Environmental Protection Agency (EPA), and a total range of 600 miles (970 km). Since the Sonata PHEV uses some gasoline during the all-electric mode, the EPA considers the actual all-electric range is between 0 to 27 miles (0 to 43 km). The EPA fuel economy rating is 99 miles per gallon gasoline equivalent (MPG-e) (2.4 L/100 km; 119 mpg-imp) in charge-depleting (all-electric) mode and a combined city/highway rating of 40 mpg_{‑US} (5.9 L/100 km; 48 mpg_{‑imp}) in hybrid mode. In contrast, the conventional 2016 model year Sonata gasoline-electric hybrid has an EPA rated combined fuel economy of 41 miles per US gallon (5.7 L/100 km; 49 mpg_{‑imp}), 39 miles per US gallon (6.0 L/100 km; 47 mpg_{‑imp}) in the city and 43 miles per US gallon (5.5 L/100 km; 52 mpg_{‑imp}) on the highway.

=== Powertrain ===
Specifications
Model	Year	Transmission	Power	Torque	Acceleration 0–100 km/h (0-62 mph) (Official)	Top speed
Gasoline
1.6 L Gamma T-GDI	2015–2019	7-speed DCT	180 PS (132 kW; 178 hp) @ 5,500 rpm	27 kg⋅m (265 N⋅m; 195 lbf⋅ft) @ 1,500–4,500 rpm		
2.0 L Nu MPI	2014–2017	6-speed automatic	168 PS (124 kW; 166 hp) @ 6,500 rpm	20.5 kg⋅m (201 N⋅m; 148 lbf⋅ft) @ 4,800 rpm		
2.0 L Nu MPI	2017–2019	6-speed automatic	163 PS (120 kW; 161 hp) @ 6,500 rpm	20 kg⋅m (196 N⋅m; 145 lbf⋅ft) @ 4,800 rpm		
2.0 L Theta II T-GDI	2015–2017	6-speed automatic	245 PS (180 kW; 242 hp) @ 6,000 rpm	36 kg⋅m (353 N⋅m; 260 lbf⋅ft) @ 1,350–4,000 rpm	7.5s	235 km/h (146 mph)
2.0 L Theta II T-GDI	2017–2019	8-speed automatic	245 PS (180 kW; 242 hp) @ 6,000 rpm	36 kg⋅m (353 N⋅m; 260 lbf⋅ft) @ 1,350–4,000 rpm	7.5s	235 km/h (146 mph)
2.4 L Theta II MPI	2014–2019	6-speed automatic	178 PS (131 kW; 176 hp) @ 6,000 rpm	23.4 kg⋅m (229 N⋅m; 169 lbf⋅ft) @ 4,000 rpm	9.5s	208 km/h (129 mph)
2.4 L Theta II GDI	2014–2019	6-speed automatic	193 PS (142 kW; 190 hp) @ 6,000 rpm	25.2 kg⋅m (247 N⋅m; 182 lbf⋅ft) @ 4,000 rpm		
Hybrid
2.0 L Nu GDI Hybrid	2014–2019	6-speed automatic	195 PS (143 kW; 192 hp) @ 6,000 rpm		9.3s	193 km/h (120 mph)
2.0 L Nu GDI Plug-in Hybrid	2015–2019	6-speed automatic	205 PS (151 kW; 202 hp) @ 6,000 rpm			
LPG
2.0 L Nu LPI	2014–2023	6-speed manual	153 PS (113 kW; 151 hp) @ 6,200 rpm	20 kg⋅m (196 N⋅m; 145 lbf⋅ft) @ 4,200 rpm		
2.0 L Nu LPI	2014–2023	6-speed automatic	151 PS (111 kW; 149 hp) @ 6,200 rpm	19.5 kg⋅m (191 N⋅m; 141 lbf⋅ft) @ 4,200 rpm		
Diesel
1.7 L U II CRDI	2014–2018	7-speed DCT	141 PS (104 kW; 139 hp) @ 4,000 rpm	34.7 kg⋅m (340 N⋅m; 251 lbf⋅ft) @ 1,750–2,500 rpm		

=== Safety ===
ANCAP test results* Hyundai Sonata (2015)
Test	Score
Overall	5 /5 stars
Frontal offset	12.84/16
Side impact	16/16
Pole	2/2
Seat belt reminders	3/3
Whiplash protection	Good
Pedestrian protection	Adequate
Electronic stability control	Standard

== Eighth generation (DN8; 2019) ==
Eighth generation
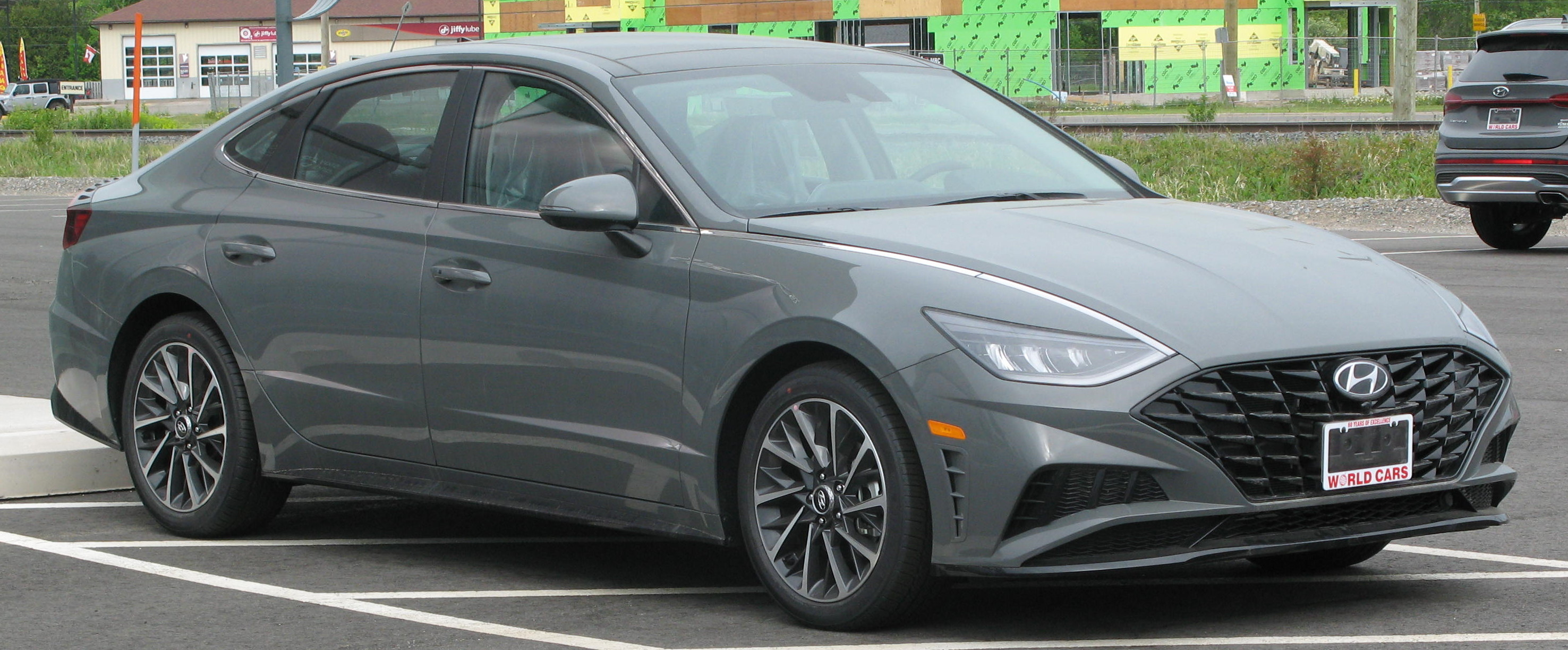
- 2021 Hyundai Sonata Luxury (pre-facelift)

Overview
- Model code: DN8
- Production: 2019–present
- Model years: 2020–present
- Assembly: South Korea: Asan (Asan Plant); United States: Montgomery, Alabama (HMMA, 2019–2022); China: Beijing (Beijing Hyundai); Pakistan: Faisalabad (Hyundai Nishat); Kazakhstan: Almaty; Vietnam: Ninh Bình (HTMV)
- Designer: Luc Donckerwolke; SangYup Lee; Ji-heon Lee; Kevin Kang; Song Hyun

Body and chassis
- Platform: Hyundai-Kia N3/N4
- Related: Kia K5 (DL3)

Powertrain
- Engine: Gasoline: 1.5 L Smartstream G1.5 T-GDi I4; 1.6 L Smartstream G1.6 T-GDi I4; 2.0 L Smartstream G2.0 MPi I4; 2.0 L Smartstream G2.0 T-GDi I4; 2.5 L Smartstream G2.5 MPi/GDi/T-GDi I4; Gasoline hybrid: 2.0 L Smartstream G2.0 GDi I4; Gasoline/LPG: 2.0 L Smartstream L2.0 LPi I4
- Electric motor: Permanent Magnet Synchronous Motor (Hybrid Version)
- Transmission: 6-speed automatic; 8-speed automatic; 7-speed D7UF1 DCT; 8-speed D8LF1 DCT
- Hybrid drivetrain: HEV
- Battery: 1.62 kWh lithium-ion polymer battery (hybrid)

Dimensions
- Wheelbase: 2,840 mm (111.8 in); 2,890 mm (113.8 in) (China)
- Length: 4,900 mm (192.9 in) (pre-facelift); 4,910 mm (193.3 in) (facelift); 4,955 mm (195.1 in) (China)
- Width: 1,860 mm (73.2 in)
- Height: 1,445 mm (56.9 in)
- Curb weight: 1,388–1,610 kg (3,060–3,549 lb); 1,495–1,615 kg (3,296–3,560 lb) (Hybrid); 1,715–1,730 kg (3,781–3,814 lb) (Plug-in Hybrid)

The eighth-generation Sonata (codename: DN8) was previewed in early March 2019 and officially launched on March 21 in South Korea. It also debuted at the 2019 Shanghai Auto Show for the Chinese market and made its North American debut at the 2019 New York International Auto Show on April 17, 2019. Despite being marketed as a mid-size sedan in North America, its interior volume placed it in the U.S. Environmental Protection Agency's full-size classification. A facelifted version was introduced in 2023.

Compared to the previous generation, the DN8 Sonata stands 30 mm (1.2 in) lower to the ground, with its width extended by 25 mm (1.0 in). Its wheelbase is lengthened by 35 mm (1.4 in) and total length by 45 mm (1.8 in).

The eighth-generation Sonata uses a new third-generation architecture and uses Hyundai's latest "Sensuous Sportiness" design language which was first previewed by the Le Fil Rouge concept. The styling is less conservative and more pronounced compared to the previous generation. It now sports a fastback-like shape and features driving lights which run all the way up the hood and full-width, C-shaped taillamps. The interior has been redesigned significantly as well, with an optional 12.3-inch digital cluster and 10.3-inch center screen.

The safety system, which comprises three radar systems, five cameras and thirteen ultrasonic sensors, allows for driver-assist features such as standard adaptive cruise control, forward-collision braking and lane-following assist.

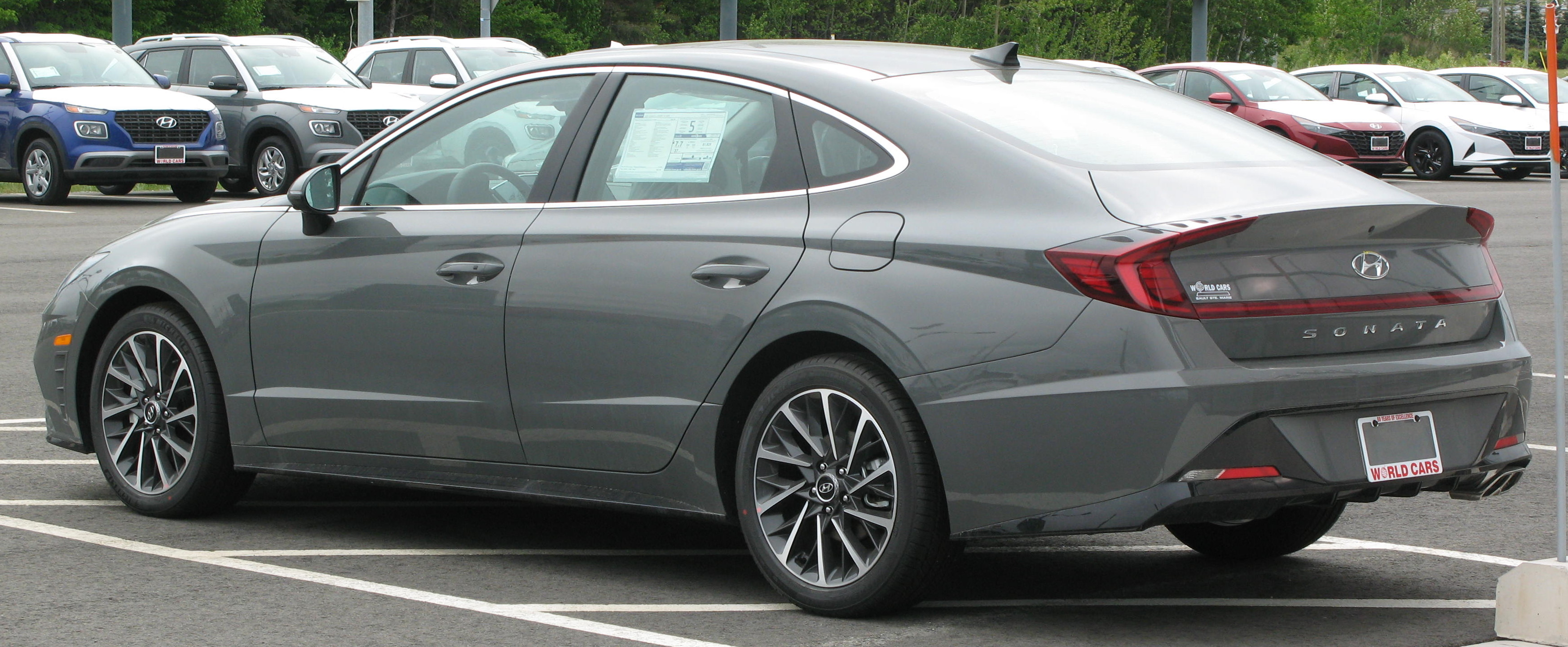
Rear view (pre-facelift)

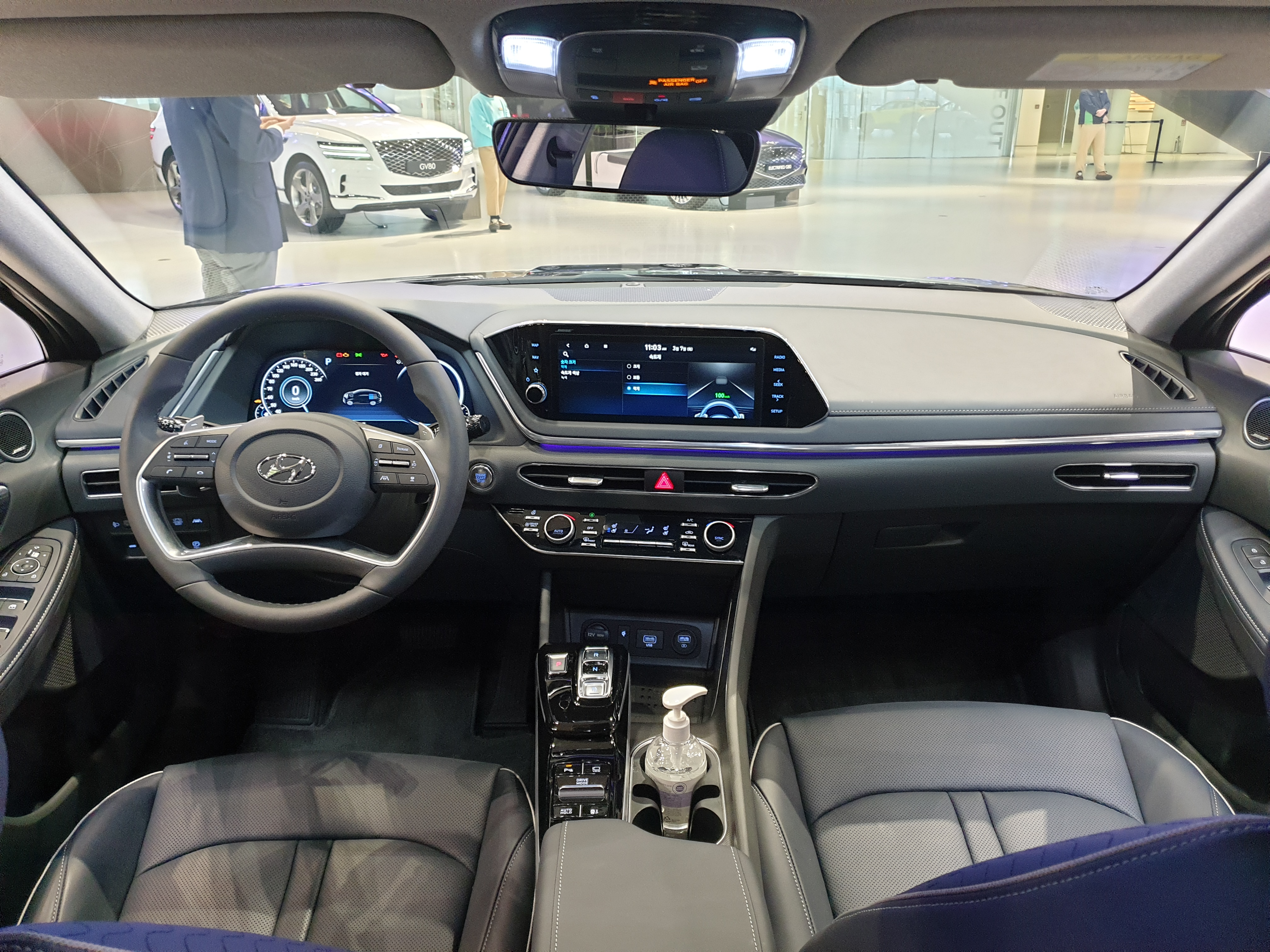
Interior (pre-facelift)

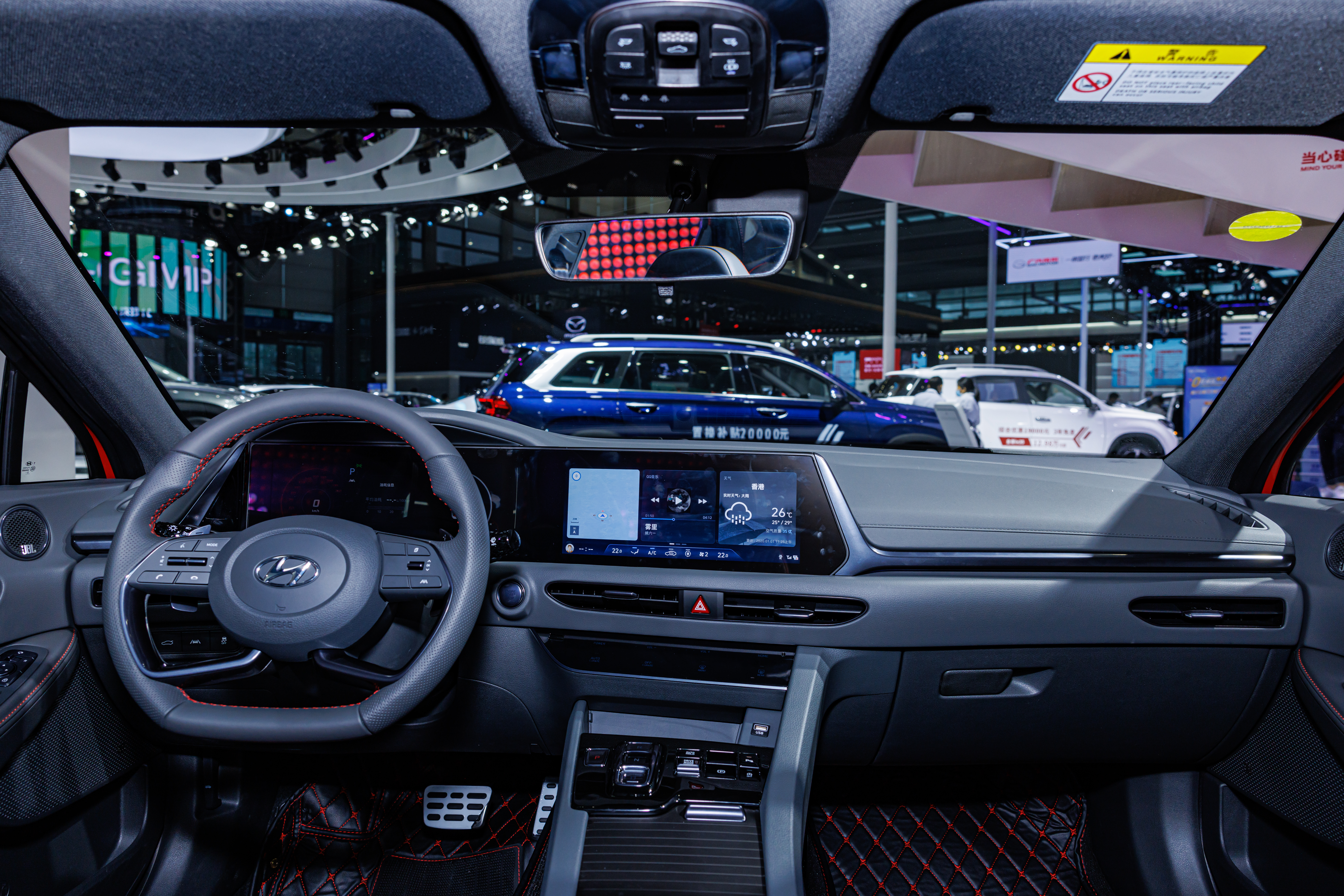
Interior (pre-facelift, China)

=== N Line ===
On September 22, 2020, Hyundai introduced the Sonata N Line. The N Line is powered by a turbocharged 2.5-liter Smartstream four-cylinder gasoline engine producing 290 hp (294 PS; 216 kW) and 311 lb⋅ft (422 N⋅m; 43.0 kg⋅m) of torque, mated to an eight-speed wet dual-clutch transmission, sharing its powertrain combination with the 2021 Kia K5 GT.

In addition to the upgraded engine and transmission, the Sonata N Line also features more aggressive exterior and interior styling over non-N Line Sonatas (these include larger, special aluminum-alloy wheels and tires, darkened exterior trim, a special black-painted grille, dual exhaust pipes, "N Line" badging on the rear trunk lid and leather-wrapped steering wheel, red interior stitching, special interior trim, and combination leather and Alcantara-trimmed seating surfaces).

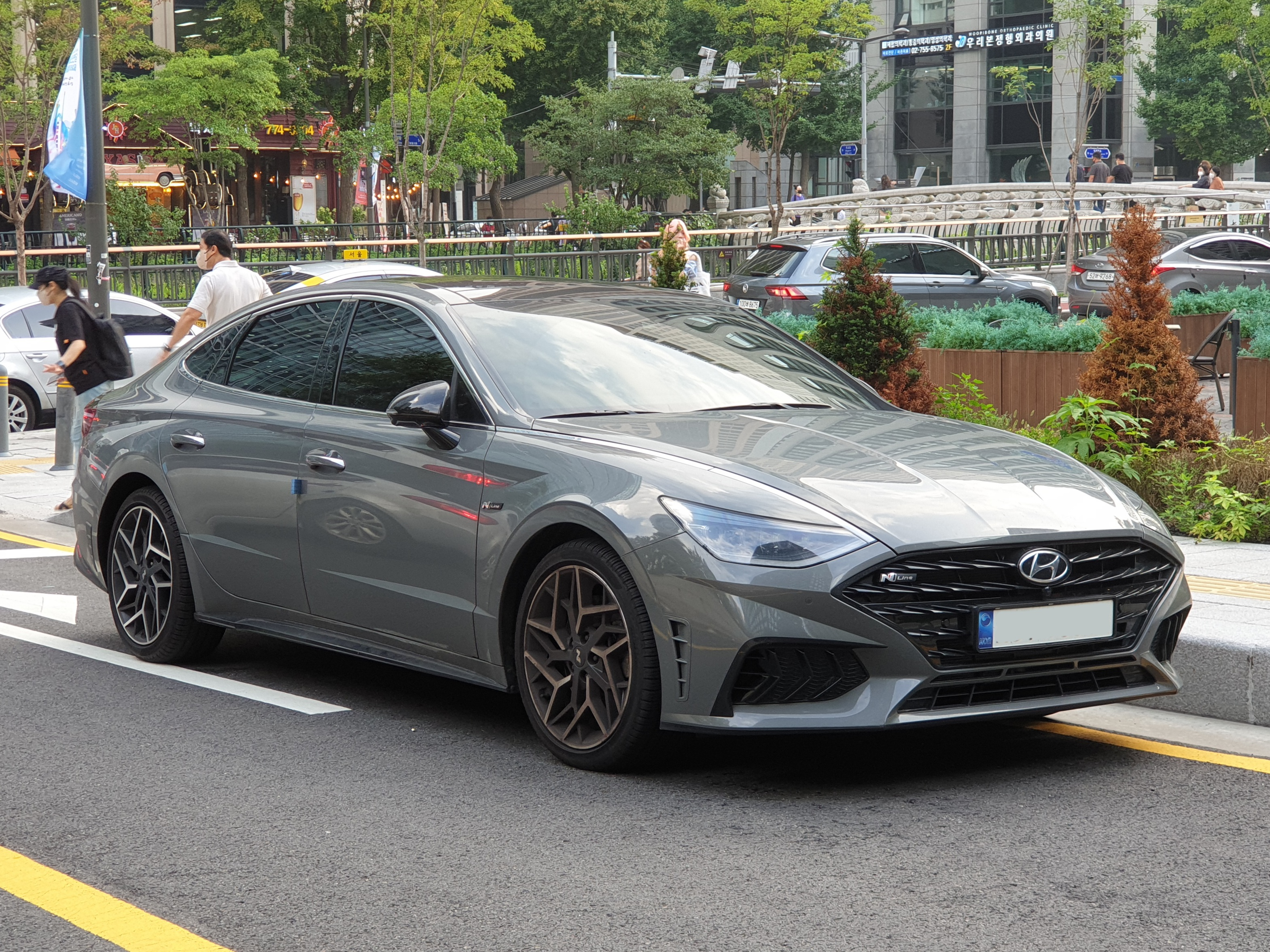
Sonata N-Line (pre-facelift)

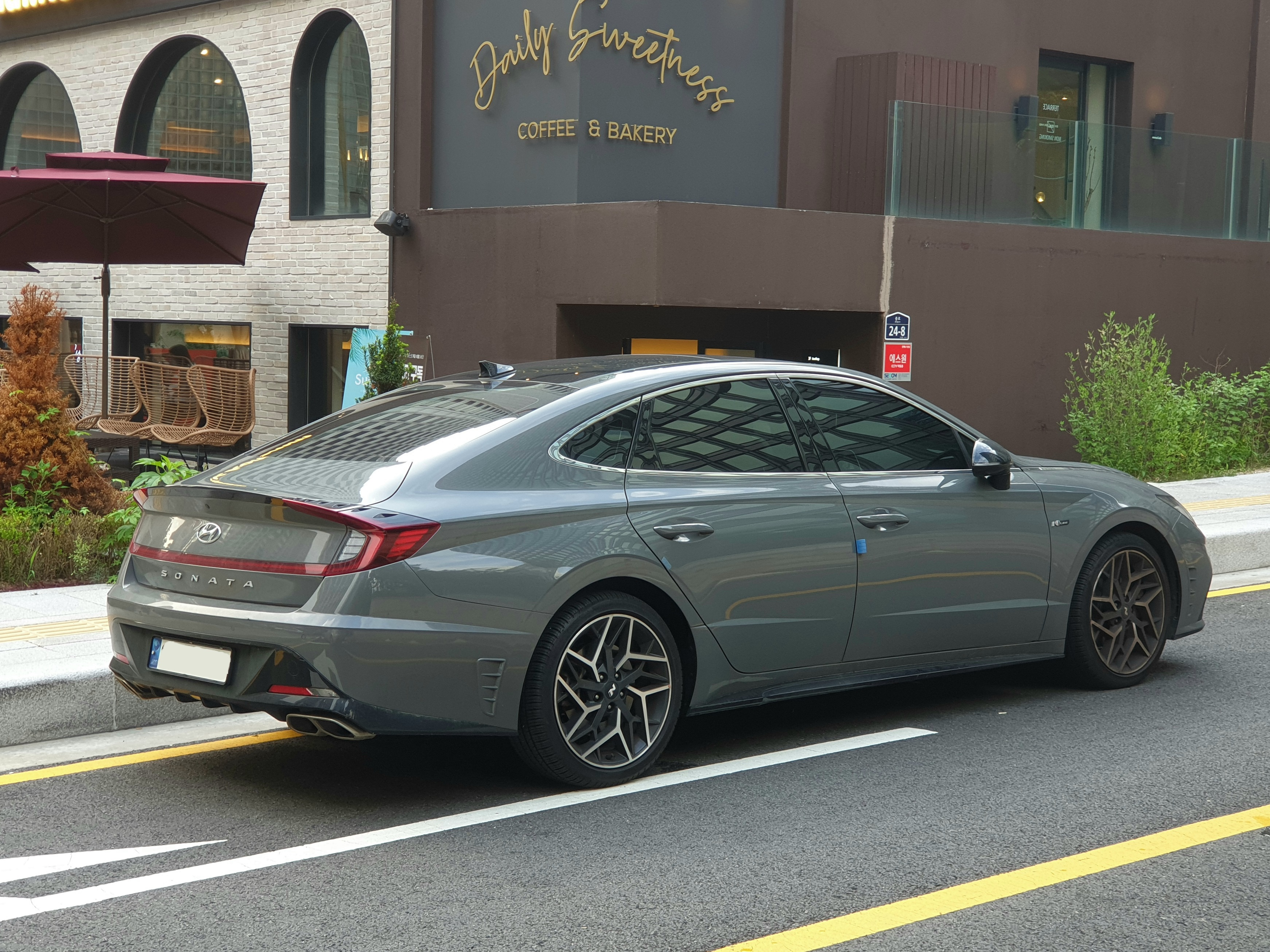
Rear view (pre-facelift)

=== Facelift ===
Presented on March 26, 2023, the facelifted Sonata was unveiled at the 2023 Seoul Mobility Show, adopting a full-width LED light bar at the front. The main headlights are hidden above the air intakes and joined by a wider grille and sharper lines. This revised version is marketed in South Korea as Sonata The Edge (Korean: 쏘나타 디 엣지).

The refreshed North American-market Sonata was introduced on August 30, 2023, alongside the refreshed 2024 Hyundai Elantra. Sonata models equipped with the 2.5L I4 engine feature Hyundai's H-TRAC all-wheel drive system as an option, in addition to standard front-wheel drive, making it the first Hyundai sedan sold in North America to be offered with HTRAC. A new curved display with two separate screens under a single pane of glass was also introduced. Wireless Apple CarPlay and Android Auto compatibility was expanded to all Sonata models, whereas it was previously limited to certain trims. Production of North American-market facelifted Sonatas takes place in South Korea following the discontinuation of Sonata production at Hyundai Motor Manufacturing Alabama in 2022.

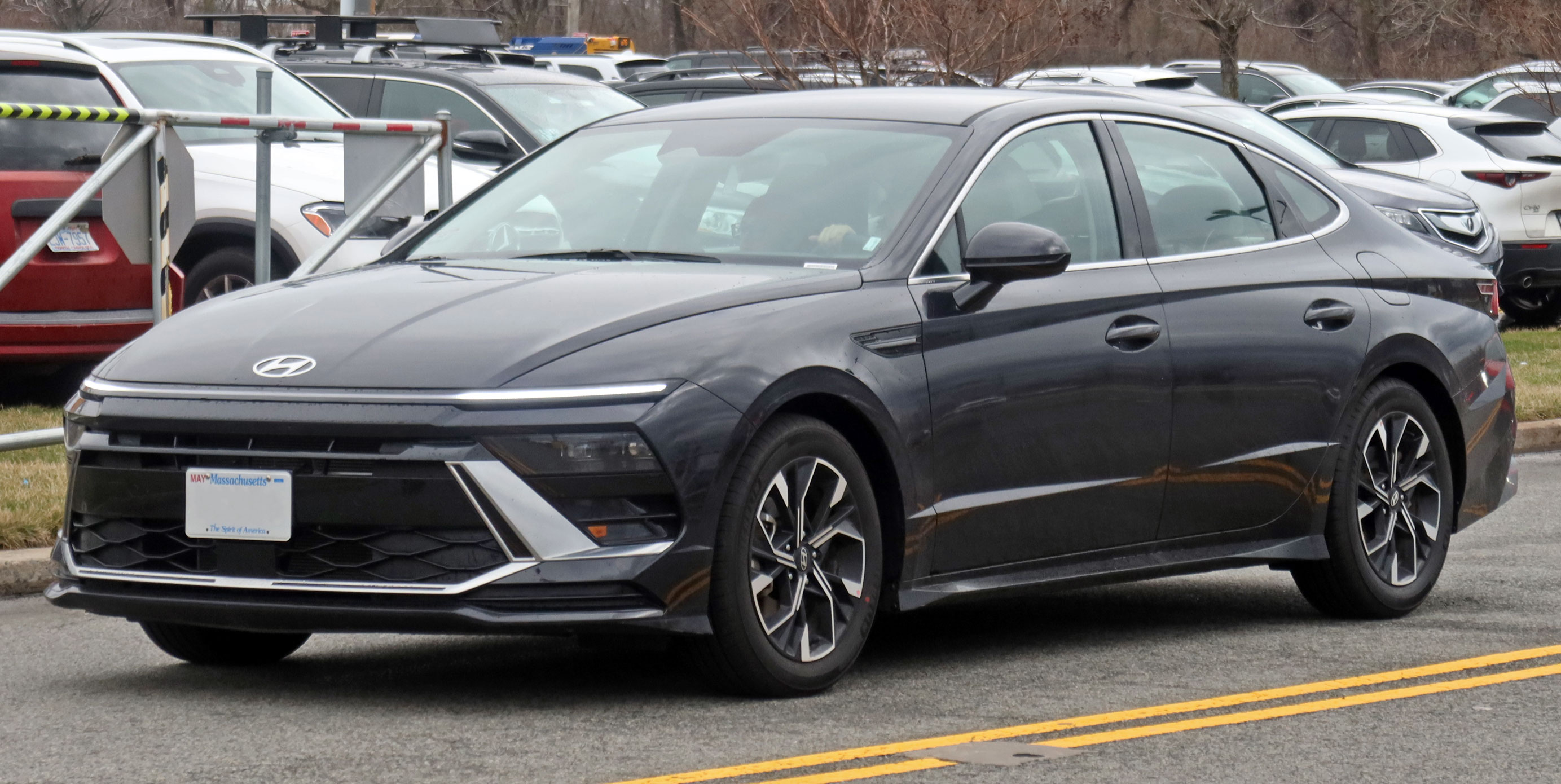
2024 Sonata (facelift)

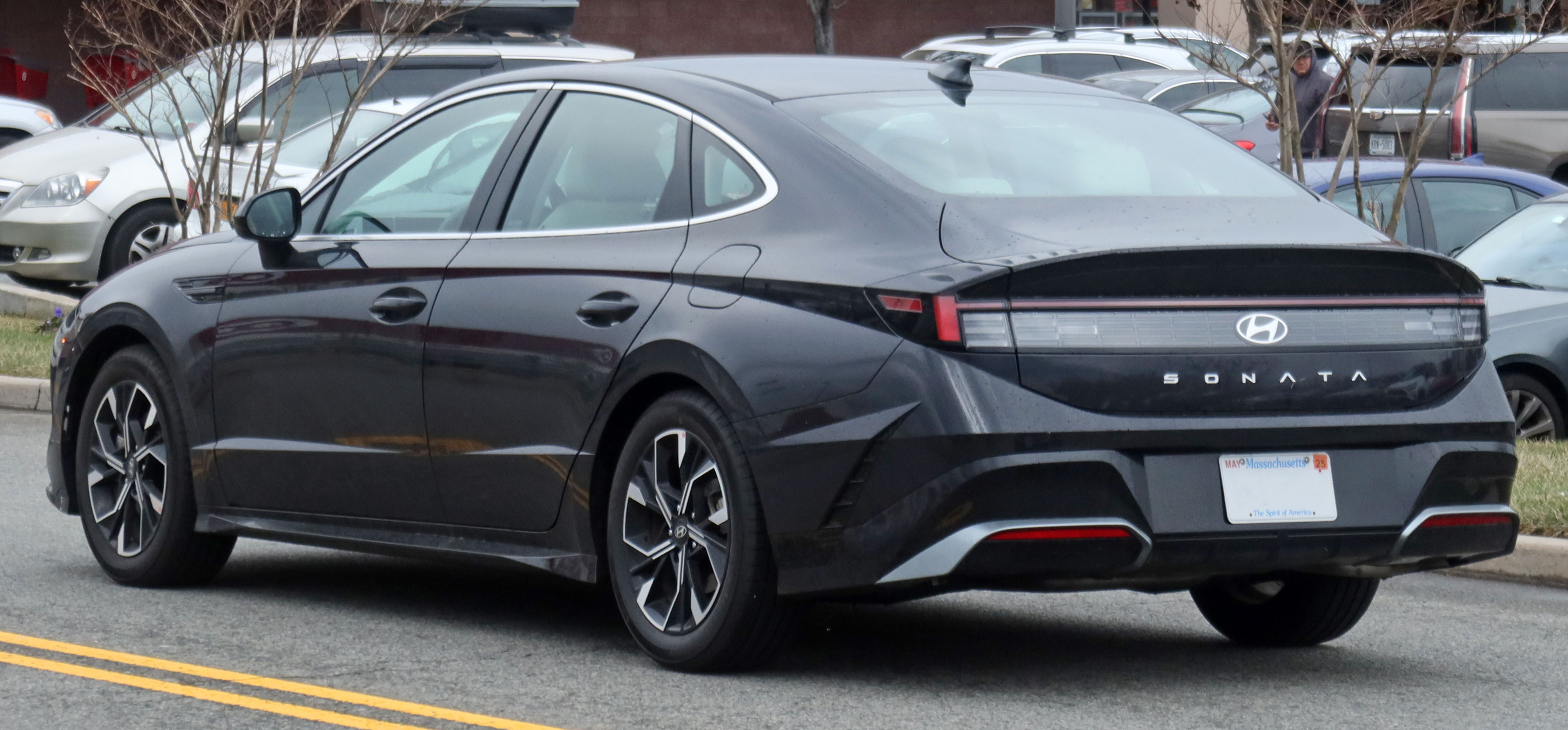
Rear view (facelift)

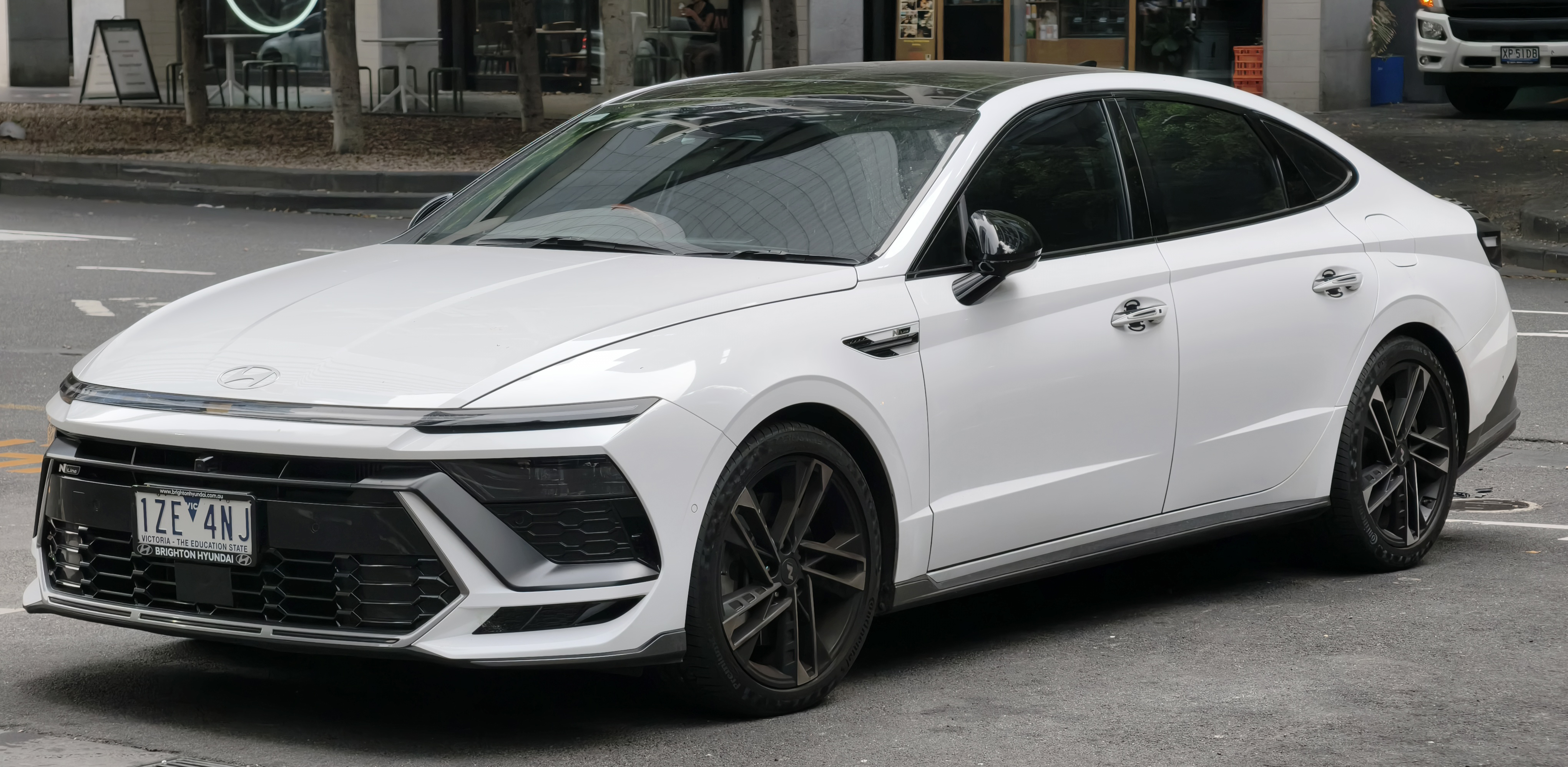
Sonata N Line (facelift)

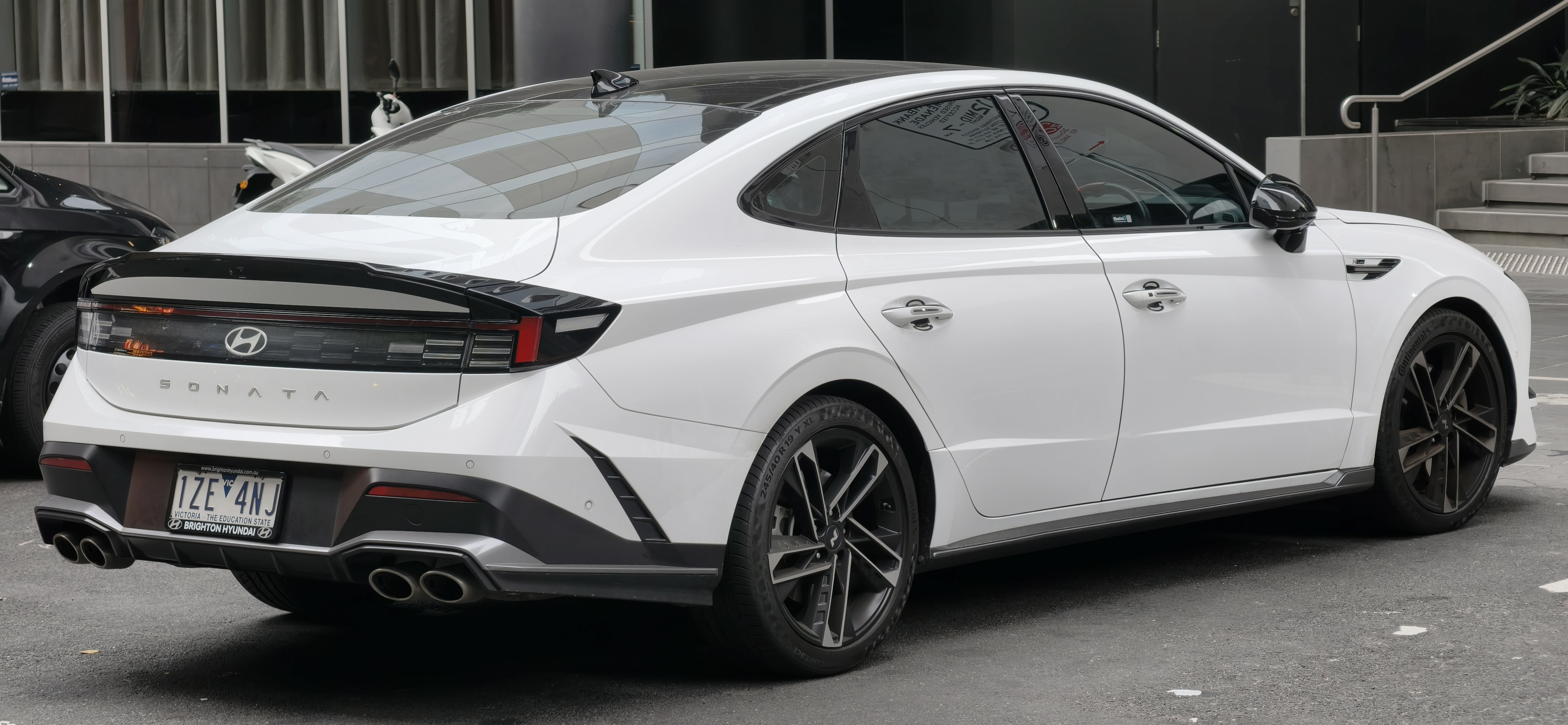
N Line Rear view (facelift)

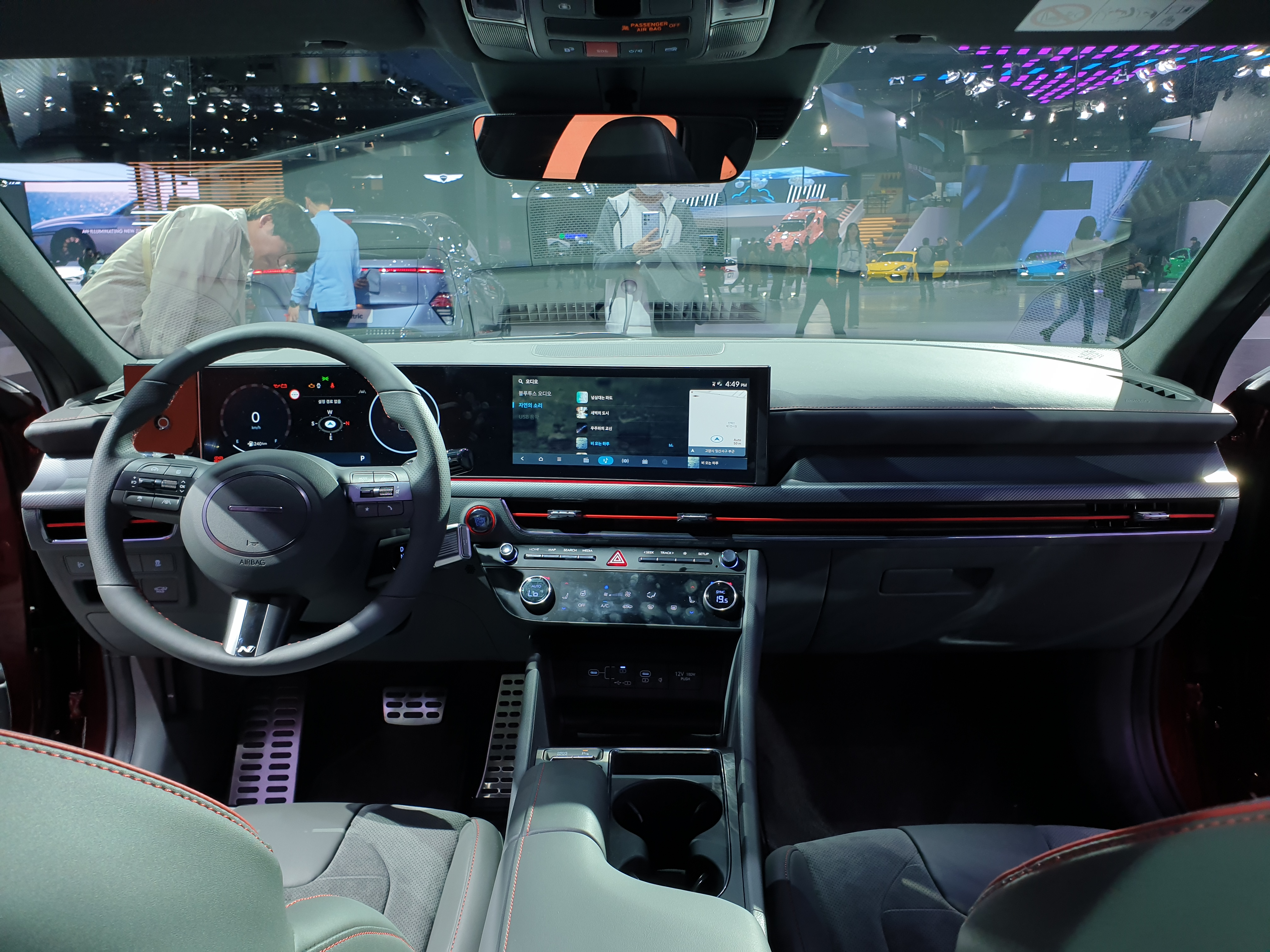
Interior (facelift)

=== Markets ===
==== North America ====
At launch, trim levels in the United States were SE, SEL, SEL Plus and Limited, offered with two inline-fours: a turbocharged 1.6-liter unit with 180 hp (182 PS; 134 kW) and a naturally aspirated 2.5-litre unit with 191 hp (194 PS; 143 kW), the latter replacing the previous 185-hp 2.4-litre unit. The performance-oriented N Line went on sale in the United States in November 2020, priced from US$33,200.

For the 2026 model year, the United States lineup consists of SE, SEL Sport, Blue Hybrid, SEL Hybrid, Limited Hybrid and N Line. All-wheel drive is available only on the SEL Sport, which uses the naturally aspirated 2.5-litre engine; the hybrid models and the N Line are front-wheel drive.

In Canada, the Sonata launched in 2020 in Preferred, Sport, Luxury and Ultimate trims, offered with the same two inline-four engines as in the United States: a turbocharged 1.6-litre unit with 180 hp (182 PS; 134 kW) and a naturally aspirated 2.5-litre unit with 191 hp (194 PS; 143 kW), the latter replacing the previous 185-hp 2.4-litre unit. The N Line arrived as a 2021 model, with Canadian pricing announced in November 2020 at CA$37,999.

For the 2026 model year, the Canadian lineup consists of Preferred-Trend AWD, Preferred-Trend Hybrid and N Line Ultimate. The Preferred-Trend AWD pairs a 2.5-litre GDI engine and an eight-speed automatic with HTRAC all-wheel drive, the Preferred-Trend Hybrid uses a 2.0-litre hybrid GDI four-cylinder engine with front-wheel drive, and the N Line Ultimate uses a 2.5-litre turbocharged GDI four-cylinder engine with front-wheel drive.

==== South Korea ====
In South Korea, the DN8 Sonata is offered with 2.0-litre gasoline, 1.6-litre turbocharged gasoline, 2.0-litreLPG (LPi) and 2.0-litre hybrid engines, with a 2.5-litre turbocharged N Line topping the range.

The Sonata Sensuous was released on April 21, 2021, applying the 1.6 turbo models's exterior styling to the 2.0-litre gasoline model with black metallic mirrors and a rear bumper diffuser.

The Sonata is also sold as a dedicated taxi variant, separate from the passenger models. Since April 2024 it has been imported from China, where it is built by Beijing Hyundai, and it uses a longer wheelbase than the previous New Rise (LF) taxi, increased by 70 mm (2.8 in) for greater rear-seat space. The taxi is fitted with a Smartstream LPG 2.0 engine, a dedicated six-speed transmission and tyres rated for about 20% greater durability. It replaced the previous LF-based Sonata Taxi, which remained in production until July 2023.

==== Australia ====
The DN8 Sonata returned to Australia in 2021, offered solely as the range-topping N Line. The facelifted N Line went on sale in October 2023 and remains the only Sonata variant sold there, powered by a 2.5-litre turbocharged engine producing 213 kW (286 hp) and 422 N⋅m, mated to an eight-speed wet dual-clutch transmission.

==== Pakistan ====
In July 2021, Hyundai Nishat Motors commenced the local assembly of Sonata in Pakistan. It comes in two variants: 2.0 L and 2.5 L. The 2.0 L variant comes with the Smartstream G2.0 MPi engine while the 2.5 L variant comes with the Smartstream G2.5 MPi engine.

In January 2025, the facelift Sonata N-Line was introduced and is assembled locally in Pakistan. In January 2025, the facelifted Sonata N Line began local assembly in Pakistan by Hyundai Nishat Motors.

=== Powertrain ===
Specifications
Model	Year	Transmission	Power	Torque	Acceleration 0–100 km/h (0-62 mph) (Official)	Top speed
gasoline
Smartstream G1.5 T-GDI	2020–2023	7-speed DCT	170 PS (125 kW; 168 hp) @ 5,500 rpm	25.8 kg⋅m (253 N⋅m; 187 lbf⋅ft) @ 1,500–4,000 rpm		210 km/h (130 mph)
Smartstream G1.6 T-GDI	2019-present	8-speed automatic	180 PS (132 kW; 178 hp) @ 5,500 rpm	27 kg⋅m (265 N⋅m; 195 lbf⋅ft) @ 1,500–4,500 rpm		
Smartstream G2.0 T-GDI	2020-present	8-speed automatic	240 PS (177 kW; 237 hp) @ 6,000 rpm	36 kg⋅m (353 N⋅m; 260 lbf⋅ft) @ 1,500–4,000 rpm		240 km/h (149 mph)
Smartstream G2.0 MPI	2019-present	6-speed automatic	152 PS (112 kW; 150 hp) @ 6,200 rpm 160 PS (118 kW; 158 hp) @ 6,500 rpm	19.6 kg⋅m (192 N⋅m; 142 lbf⋅ft) @ 4,000 rpm 20.0 kg⋅m (196 N⋅m; 145 lbf⋅ft) @ 4,800 rpm	10.5s (152PS)	200 km/h (124 mph)
Smartstream G2.5 MPI	2020-present	6-speed automatic	180 PS (132 kW; 178 hp) @ 6,000 rpm	23.7 kg⋅m (232 N⋅m; 171 lbf⋅ft) @ 4,000 rpm	9.0s	210 km/h (130 mph)
Smartstream G2.5 GDI	2019-present	8-speed automatic	194 PS (143 kW; 191 hp) @ 6,100 rpm	25 kg⋅m (245 N⋅m; 181 lbf⋅ft) @ 4,000 rpm		
Smartstream G2.5 T-GDI	2020–present	8-speed dual-clutch automatic	290 PS (213 kW; 286 hp) @ 5,800 rpm	43 kg⋅m (422 N⋅m; 311 lbf⋅ft) @ 1,650–4,000 rpm	5.4s	240 km/h (149 mph)
Hybrid
Smartstream G2.0 GDI; Hybrid	2020–present	6-speed automatic	152 PS (112 kW; 150 hp) @ 6,000 rpm (Engine); 52 PS (38 kW; 51 hp) @ 1,770–2,000 rpm (Electric Motor); 195 PS (143 kW; 192 hp) @ 6,000 rpm (Combined)	19.2 kg⋅m (188 N⋅m; 139 lbf⋅ft) @ 5,000 rpm (Engine); 20.9 kg⋅m (205 N⋅m; 151 lbf⋅ft) @ 0–1,770 rpm (Electric Motor); 37.5 kg⋅m (368 N⋅m; 271 lbf⋅ft) (Combined)	8.3s	200 km/h (124 mph)
LPG
Smartstream L2.0 LPI	2019–present	6-speed automatic	146 PS (107 kW; 144 hp) @ 6,000 rpm	19.5 kg⋅m (191 N⋅m; 141 lbf⋅ft) @ 4,200 rpm		

=== Safety ===
IIHS:
Category	Rating
Small overlap front	Good (Note: Good on both driver and passenger sides)
Moderate overlap front: updated test	Good (Note: applies to 2025-2026 models built after November 2024)
Side impact: updated test	Good (Note: applies to 2024-2026 models)
Headlights	Good (Note: All trims)
Front crash prevention: vehicle-to-vehicle 2.0	Acceptable
Front crash prevention: pedestrian	Good
Seat belt reminders	Good
LATCH ease of use	Acceptable

== Sales ==
Year	U.S.	Canada	South Korea	China
1989	34,698			
1990	29,840			
1991	26,421			
1992	17,196			
1993	15,420			
1994	13,339			
1995	17,055			
1996	14,616			
1997	22,128			
1998	14,144			
1999	30,022			
2000	45,983			
2001	62,385			
2002	68,085			
2003	82,330			
2004	107,189	6,974		
2005	130,365	8,175		
2006	149,513	12,466		
2007	145,568	11,034		
2008	117,357	10,298		
2009	120,028	8,975	146,326	
2010	196,623	13,856	152,023	
2011	225,961	16,343	104,080	
2012	230,605	14,572	103,994	
2013	203,648	14,519	89,400	
2014	216,936	13,645	108,014	
2015	213,303	12,419	108,438	
2016	199,408	10,191	82,203	
2017	131,803	7,827	82,703	
2018	105,118	5,197	65,846	
2019	87,466	3,680	100,003	
2020	76,997	3,585	67,440	
2021	83,434	4,121	63,109	
2022	52,140	2,744	48,308	
2023	40,655	1,606	39,641	2,799
2024	61,701	2,135	39,311	11,070
2025	60,094	2,611	52,435	14,434

== See also ==
- List of Hyundai vehicles
