= Hyundai Santa Fe =

Mid-size crossover SUV

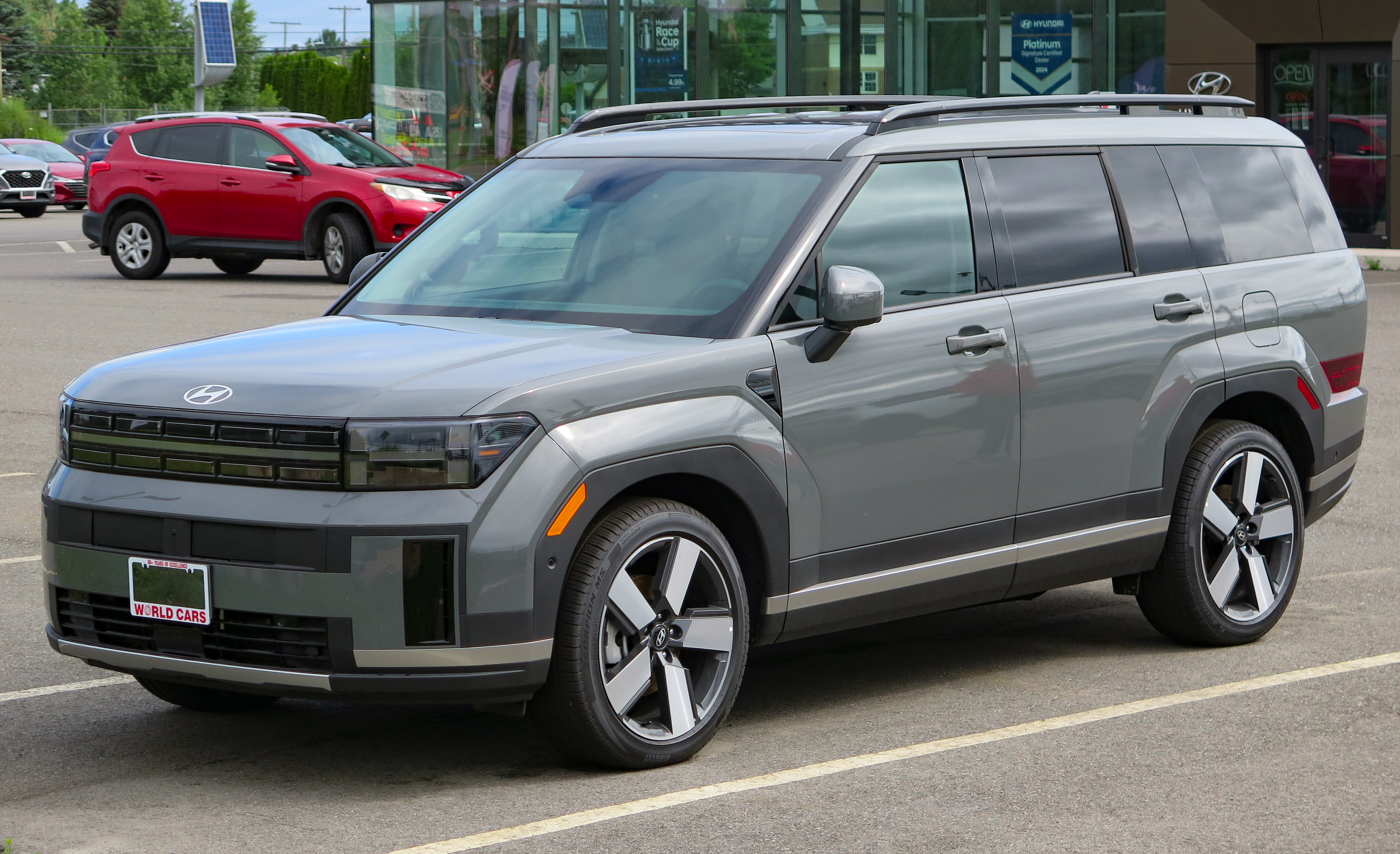
- Hyundai Santa Fe Limited (fifth generation)

Overview
- Manufacturer: Hyundai
- Also called: Hyundai Maxcruz (LWB, South Korea; 2013–2019)
- Production: June 2000 – present
- Model years: 2001–present

Body and chassis
- Class: Compact SUV (2000–2006); Mid-size SUV (2005–present)
- Body style: 5-door crossover SUV
- Layout: Front-engine, front-wheel-drive Front-engine, all-wheel-drive
- Chassis: Unibody

The Hyundai Santa Fe (Korean: 현대 싼타페) is a series of crossover SUVs produced across five generations by the South Korean manufacturer Hyundai since 2000. It is named after the city of Santa Fe, New Mexico, and was introduced for the 2001 model year as Hyundai's first SUV. The Santa Fe was a milestone in the company's restructuring program of the late 1990s because the SUV was a hit with American buyers.

The Santa Fe was initially marketed as a compact SUV in its first-generation. After the Tucson was introduced in 2004, marketed under that same class, the Santa Fe was later repositioned into the mid-size SUV class since its second-generation launched in 2005. Through all generations, the Santa Fe has been offered in either front-wheel drive or all-wheel drive.

The third-generation Santa Fe introduced in 2012 was available in two versions, which are regular (short) and extended long-wheelbase version. The short model was sold as the Santa Fe Sport in North America (three-row seating was not available) and simply Santa Fe in global markets (three-row seating was standard or optional), while the extended long-wheelbase model is called the Santa Fe in the U.S., Santa Fe XL in Canada and called the Hyundai Maxcruz in South Korea. The fourth-generation model, which was launched in 2018, introduced hybrid and plug-in hybrid powertrains in selected markets for the 2021 model year. The fifth-generation model, which was launched in 2023, adopted a boxier design, placed greater emphasis on three-row seating, and offered petrol, hybrid and plug-in hybrid powertrains depending on the market, while dropping diesel engines.

== First generation (SM; 2000) ==
First generation
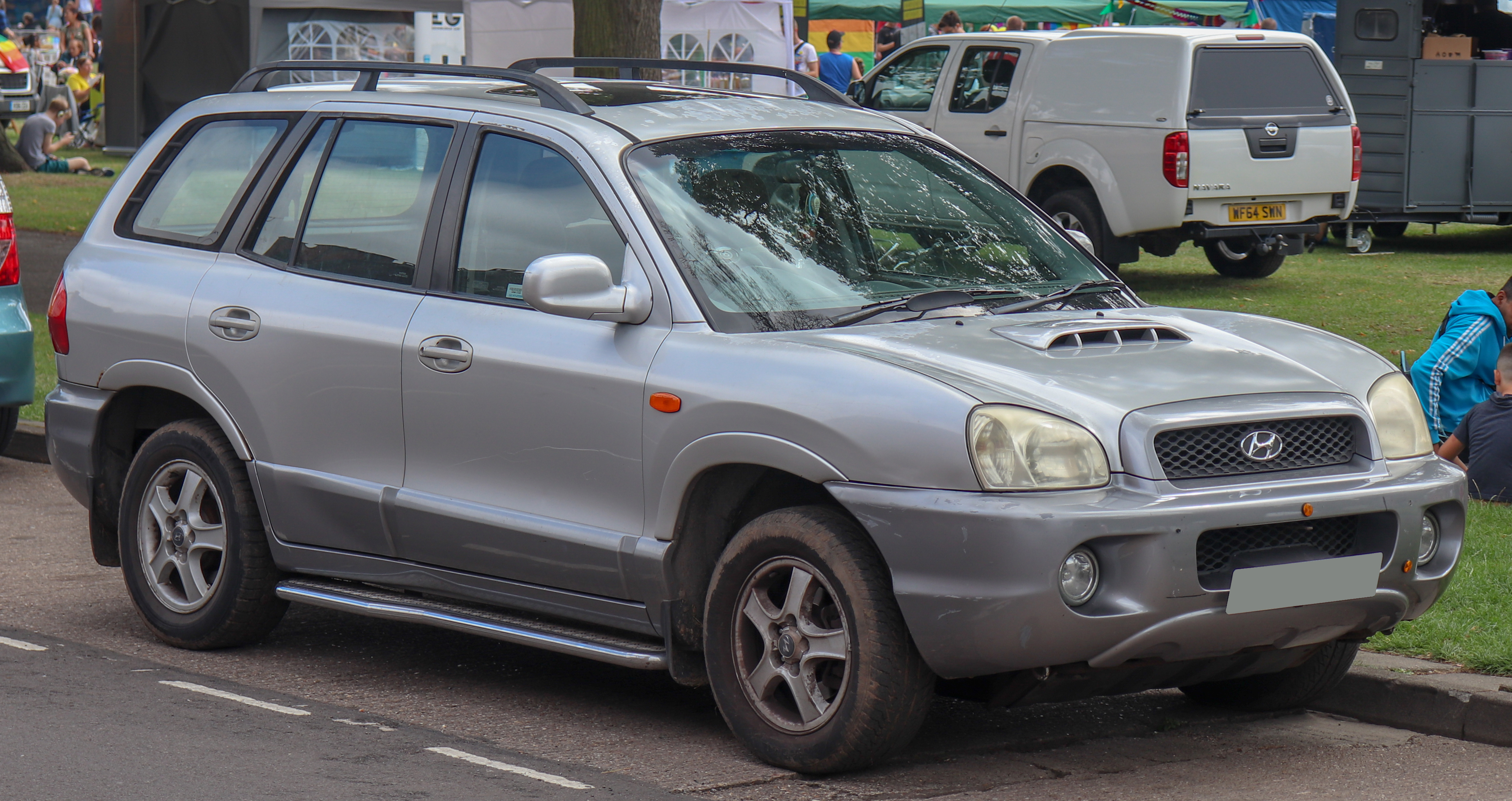
- 2001 Hyundai Santa Fe (UK)

Overview
- Model code: SM
- Also called: Hawtai Shengdafei (China); Hyundai Santa Fe Classic (Russia)
- Production: June 2000 – June 2006; 2007–2012 (Russia); 2006–2015 (China)
- Model years: 2001–2006
- Assembly: South Korea: Ulsan; China: Rongcheng, Shandong (Hawtai); Russia: Taganrog (TagAZ); Egypt: Cairo (Ghabbour Group)
- Designer: K.S. Kim (1997)

Body and chassis
- Platform: Hyundai-Kia Y4
- Related: Hyundai Sonata (EF); Hyundai Trajet; JAC Rein

Powertrain
- Engine: Petrol: 1.8 L Rover 18K4G I4 (China); 2.0 L Mitsubishi 4G94D I4 (China); 2.4 L Sirius I4; 2.7 L Delta DOHC V6; 3.5 L Sigma V6; LPG: 2.7 L Delta LPi V6; Diesel: 2.0L D4EA CRDi-VGT I4; 2.0 L Hawtai OED483Q I4 (China)
- Transmission: 5-speed manual 4-speed automatic 5-speed automatic

Dimensions
- Wheelbase: 2,620 mm (103.1 in)
- Length: 4,500 mm (177.2 in)
- Width: 1,820–1,845 mm (71.7–72.6 in)
- Height: 1,675 mm (65.9 in); 1,730 mm (68.1 in) (China)
- Kerb weight: 1,585–1,820 kg (3,494–4,012 lb)

=== 2001 ===
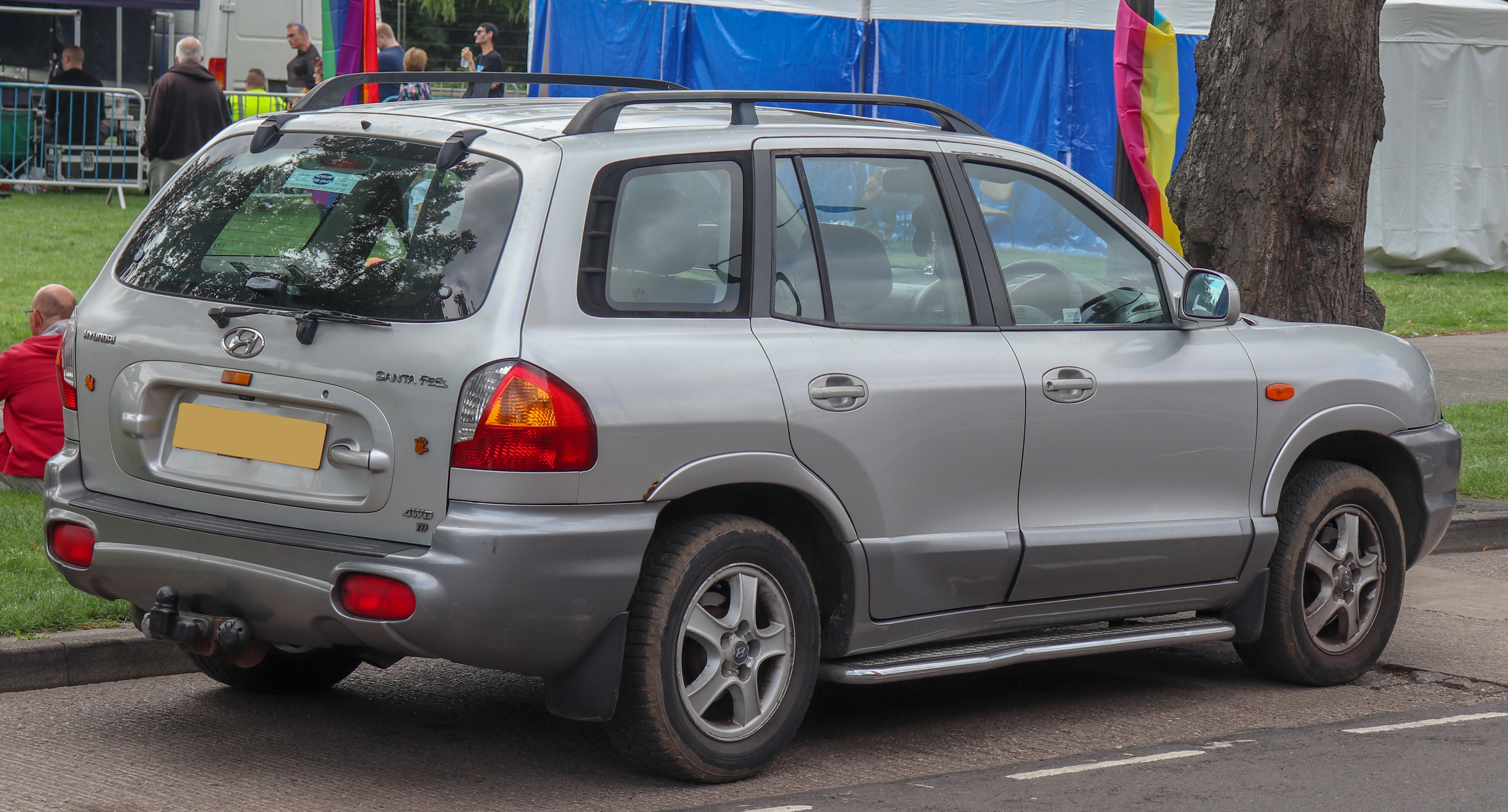
2001 Hyundai Santa Fe (UK)

In its first year in production, the Santa Fe was offered with one of two engine and transmission combinations. In North America, a fuel-efficient 2.4 L four-cylinder engine was standard equipment and could be mated with either a 5-speed manual or a 4-speed automatic. A 2,656 cc (2.7 L; 160 cu in) Delta V6 offered more power than the four-cylinder but was only available with the automatic. Front-wheel drive was standard (with traction control optional with the V6) and 4WD was optional. A 2.0 L Common Rail Turbo Diesel (CRTD) was offered outside the United States. Australian Santa Fes went on sale in November 2000 with only one engine/transmission choice – a 2.7L V6 mated to a four-speed automatic transmission. 4WD was standard. A cheaper 2.4L four-cylinder joined the range several months later in 2001, but was only available with a manual transmission.

=== 2002 ===
The Santa Fe entered its second year with only one minor change involving the placement of the V6 emblem to a higher location on the tailgate. In February 2002, the centre dash vents and buttons were restyled. The clock was relocated to the centre dash from its prior location in the overhead map light assembly, which was also restyled. In April 2002, seat-mounted combination head and torso airbags were made standard for front occupants. Demand for the Santa Fe continued to be up but owners had several suggested changes for Hyundai.

Mid-2002

In a rare mid-year model change, Hyundai increased fuel tank capacity from 64 to 71 L (14.1 to 15.6 imp gal; 16.9 to 18.8 US gal) and a sunroof option was added in May 2002. At the same time, chrome interior door handles replaced matte gray handles and a chrome shifter gate on automatic equipped models replaced matte silver gate trim. Few models also received a factory alarm confirmation chirp feature when locked twice via remote, but was rarely equipped until the 2003 model began production.

=== 2003 ===
In 2003, Hyundai responded to some of the customer complaints and suggestions such as the fact that the bonnet used a prop and not gas struts, there was no light in the glove compartment, and the car itself did not have enough power. In 2003, Hyundai introduced the 3.5-litre V6 in addition to the other two petrol engines in North America. The bigger engine came with a computer-controlled four-wheel drive system and a 5-speed automatic, based on the standard 4-speed. A Monsoon high-performance sound system came standard on the mid-level GLS model and came with a 6-disc CD changer on the top-tier LX. Rounding out the changes in the 2003 model was the discontinuation of the highly unpopular Pine Green which in some owner circles has gained the nickname 'Yucky Green'. In Australia, the four-cylinder Santa Fe was dropped in 2003, due to slow sales, leaving the 2.7L V6 automatic as the only model.

=== 2004 ===
Hyundai continued to post sales records with the Santa Fe as it rolled into 2004 with very minor changes. The manual climate controls on the base GL and mid-line GLS were revised very slightly. The remote keyless entry confirmation 'chirp' when the 'LOCK' button on the remote was pressed twice became standard.

Mid-2004

Midway through the year the AM/FM antenna was moved from on the glass in the rear driver's side window to a three-inch (76 mm) rubber antenna in the centre of the roof just above the tailgate.

=== 2005 ===
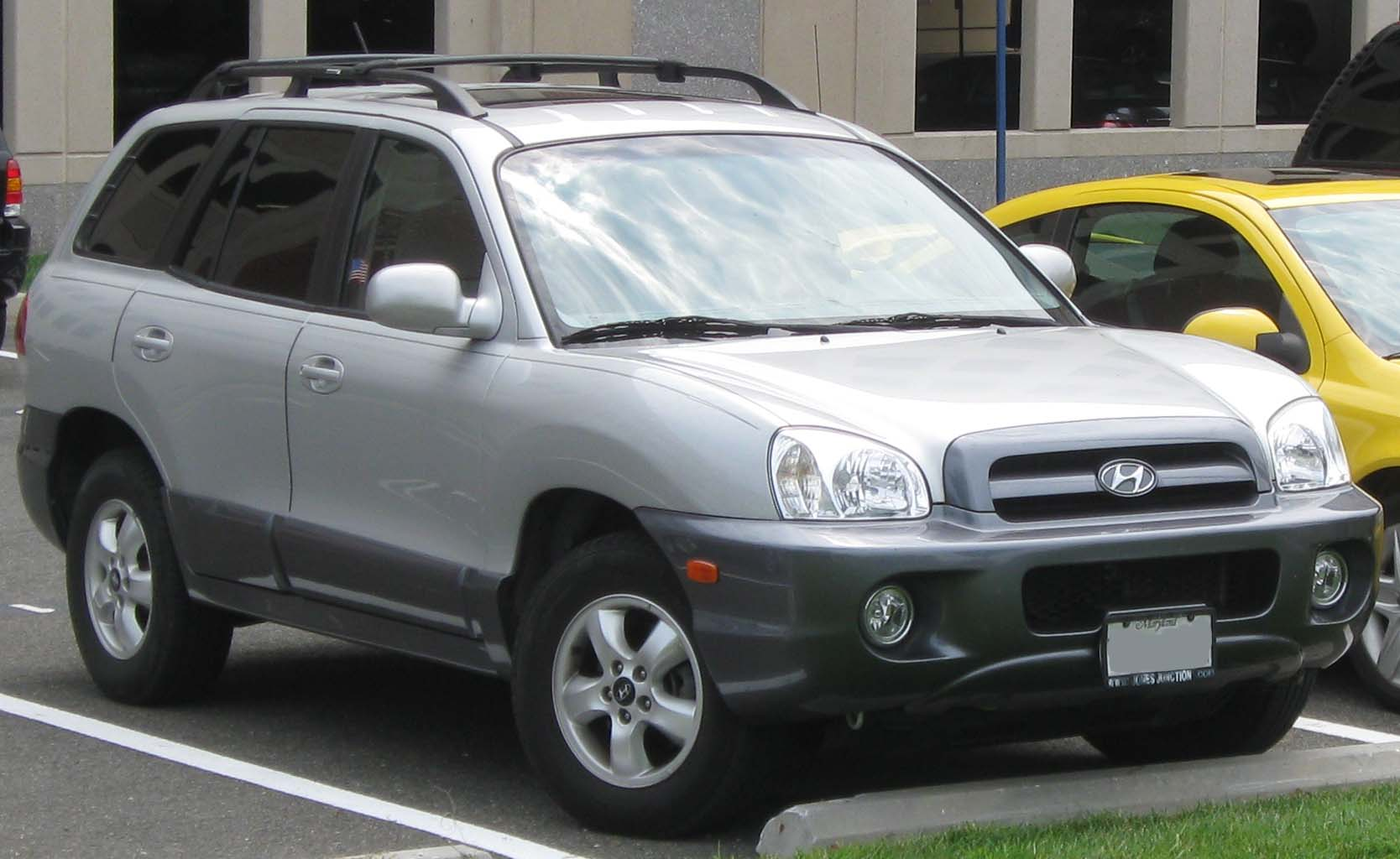
2005–2006 Hyundai Santa Fe (US)

The Santa Fe received its final facelift for 2005. Changes were made to the grille, tail lights, rear bumper, interior instrument cluster. The instrument cluster was redesigned with the speedometer reading 140 mph (225 km/h) (earlier models only indicated 130 mph) and a better-designed toll ticket slot in the driver's sun visor. Both sun visors also received extensions so the sun could be blocked out better when coming in from the side. The base Santa Fe was discontinued that time, making way for the Tucson.

In Australia, all models received body-coloured (painted) bumpers from 2005 on. The colour 'Sandstone' was discontinued in favour of a slightly different colour named 'Mocha Frost'. The GL trim was dropped as was the four-cylinder engine and its respective 5-speed manual transmission. The 2.7 L V6 took over duties as the base engine. A passenger airbag cutoff that prevents the airbag from deploying if the seat is unoccupied (or occupied by a small person) was also added. A 3-point seatbelt was added to the centre rear seating position, as well. The calendar function, housed in the overhead console was removed and a compass took its place.

=== 2006 ===
The last year of this Santa Fe saw few changes. Two colours were discontinued for 2006, Merlot and Canyon Red. A rare colour, Dark Emerald Green, was introduced mid-year. It did not appear in any sales brochures and could have only been ordered by a dealership. The LX trim level was renamed 'Limited' and got a corresponding tailgate badge, a first for the Santa Fe of any trim level. Another first was the availability of a monochromatic paint scheme, a departure from the contrasting gray cladding previously standard. The monochromatic option was only available on the Limited in black.

In Europe, the new Santa Fe model was launched in April as a 2006 model, offering a new 2.2-litre diesel-powered engine and updated 2.7-litre petrol-powered V6.

=== Hawtai ===
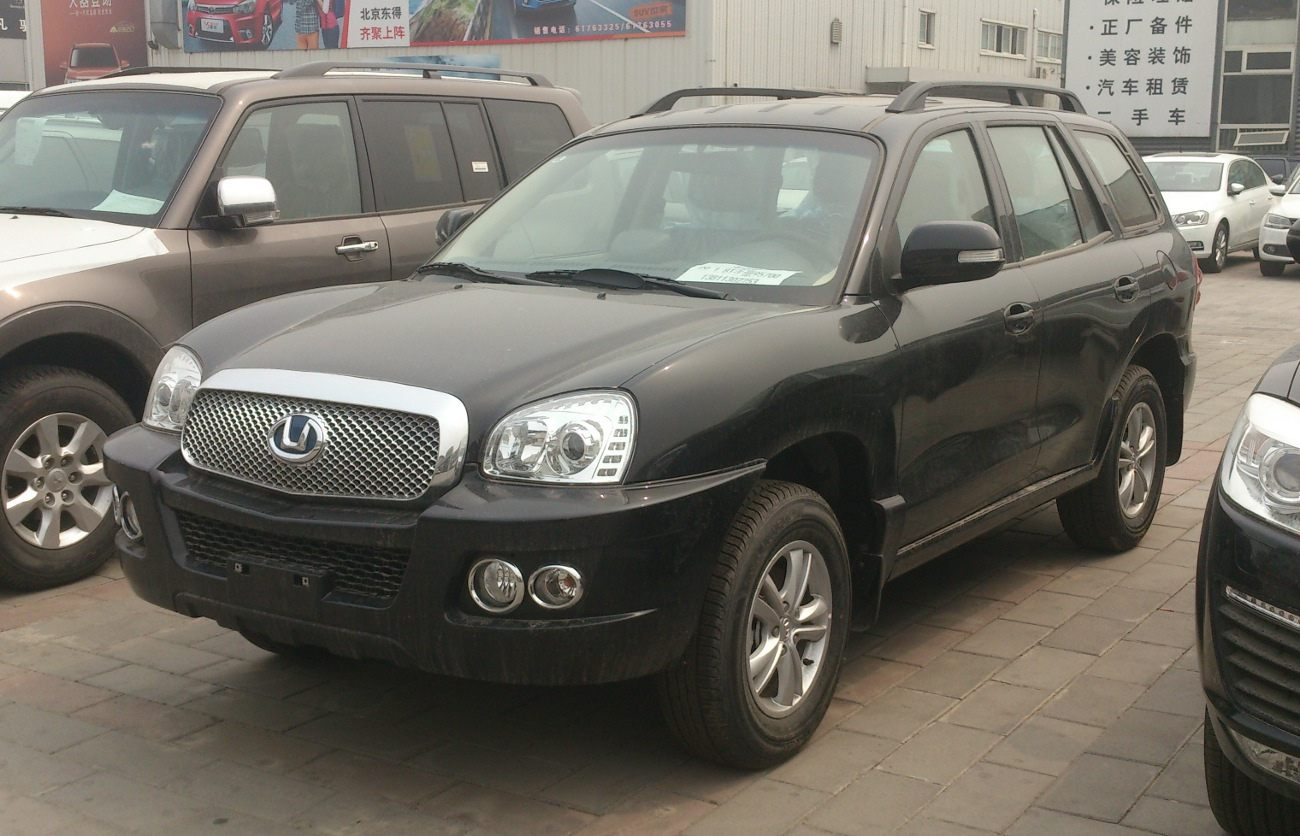
Hawtai Shengdafei (China)

Part of a joint venture with Hyundai Motors that began in 2002, a Chinese company, Hawtai Motor, manufactured the first-generation Santa Fe, marketed as the Shengdafei. While it did make Hyundai-branded models for sale on the Chinese market, one of the versions it debuted under its own brand name in 2009 was the Santa Fe C9. Utilizing a 1.8-litre turbocharged inline-four engine acquired from Rover, it was intended to be priced at a significant discount to those bearing the Hyundai name.

Hyundai ended its partnership with Hawtai in 2010 and production ended in 2015.

=== Safety ===
==== Euro NCAP ====
Euro NCAP test results* Hyundai Santa Fe 2.0 GRD (LHD) (2002)
Test	Score	Rating
Adult occupant:	25	4 /5 stars
Pedestrian:	4	1 /4 stars

==== IIHS ====
IIHS scores (2001 model year)
Moderate overlap front (original test)	Good
Head restraints and seats	Poor

== Second generation (CM; 2005) ==
Second generation
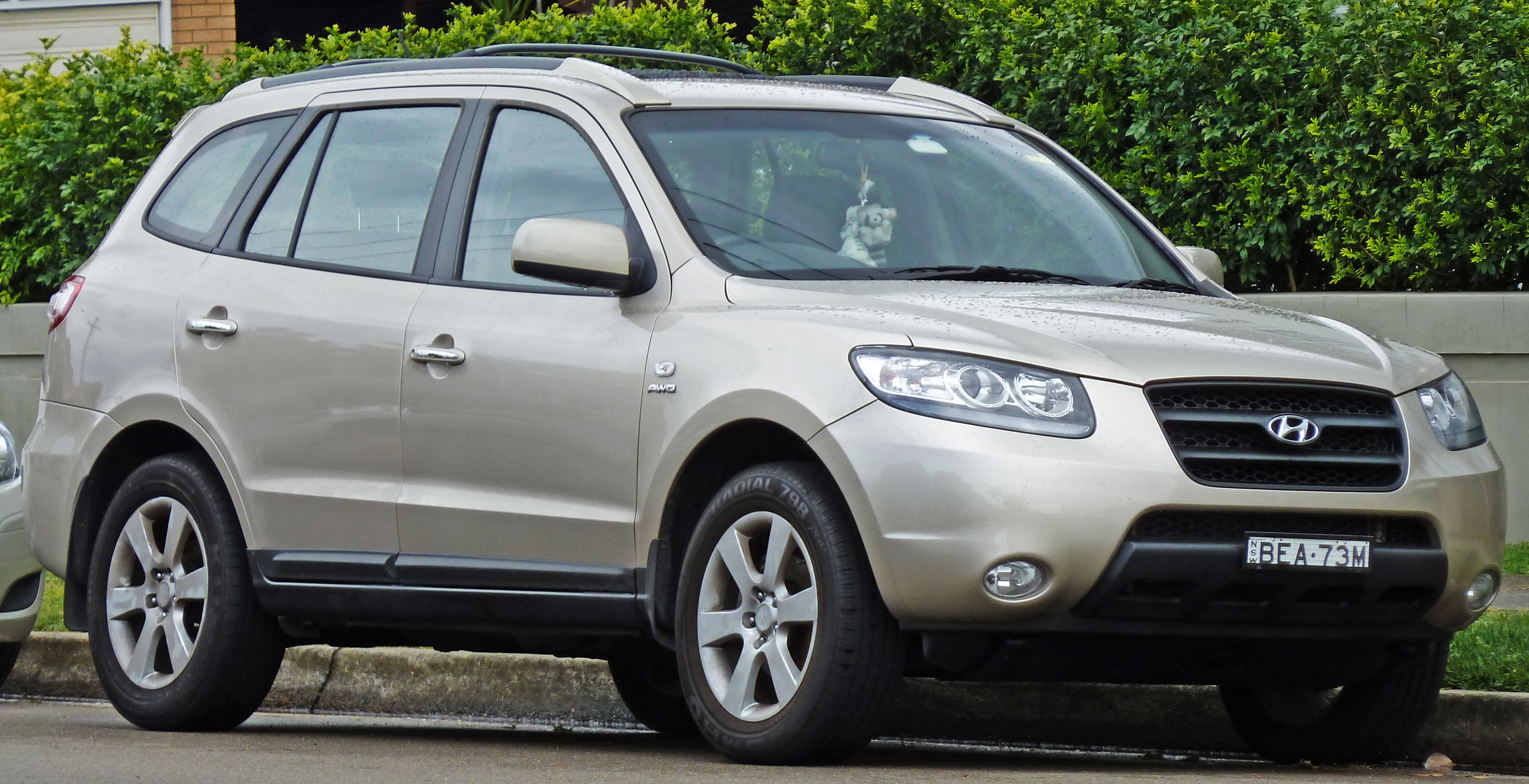
- Pre-facelift Hyundai Santa Fe Elite (Australia)

Overview
- Model code: CM
- Also called: Inokom Santa Fe (Malaysia)
- Production: 2005–2012
- Model years: 2007–2012
- Assembly: South Korea: Ulsan; United States: Montgomery, Alabama (HMMA); West Point, Georgia (KMMG); Malaysia: Kulim (Inokom); Egypt: Cairo (Ghabbour Group); India: Chennai (HMIL); Taiwan: Hukou (Sanyang Motor)

Body and chassis
- Platform: Hyundai-Kia Y5
- Related: Hyundai Sonata; Hyundai Veracruz/ix55; Hyundai Grandeur/Azera; Kia Optima; Kia Carens; Kia Sorento

Powertrain
- Engine: Petrol: 1.5 L Mitsubishi 4G15 I4 (China); 1.5 L SAIC 15S4G I4 (China); 2.0 L Mitsubishi 4G94 I4 (China); 2.4 L Theta II MPi I4; 2.7 L Mu CVVT V6; 3.3 L Lambda CVVT V6; 3.5 L Lambda II CVVT V6; LPG: 2.7 L Mu LPi V6; Diesel: 2.0 L D CRDi-VGT I4; 2.0 L OED483Q I4 (China); 2.0 L R CRDi-VGT I4; 2.2 L D CRDi-VGT I4; 2.2 L R CRDi-VGT I4
- Transmission: 5-speed manual 6-speed manual 4-speed automatic 5-speed automatic 6-speed automatic

Dimensions
- Wheelbase: 2,700 mm (106.3 in)
- Length: 4,675 mm (184.1 in)
- Width: 1,890 mm (74.4 in)
- Height: 1,725 mm (67.9 in)
- Kerb weight: 1,720–1,905 kg (3,792–4,200 lb)

=== 2007 ===
The new 2006 Santa Fe went on sale in South Korea in late 2005. In the United States, it debuted at the 2006 North American International Auto Show in Detroit. The first production Santa Fe in the United States rolled off Hyundai's Montgomery, Alabama assembly line on 18 April 2006. It shared this assembly line with the Hyundai Sonata. This new generation shed the old style's quirky design in favour of a more contemporary look.

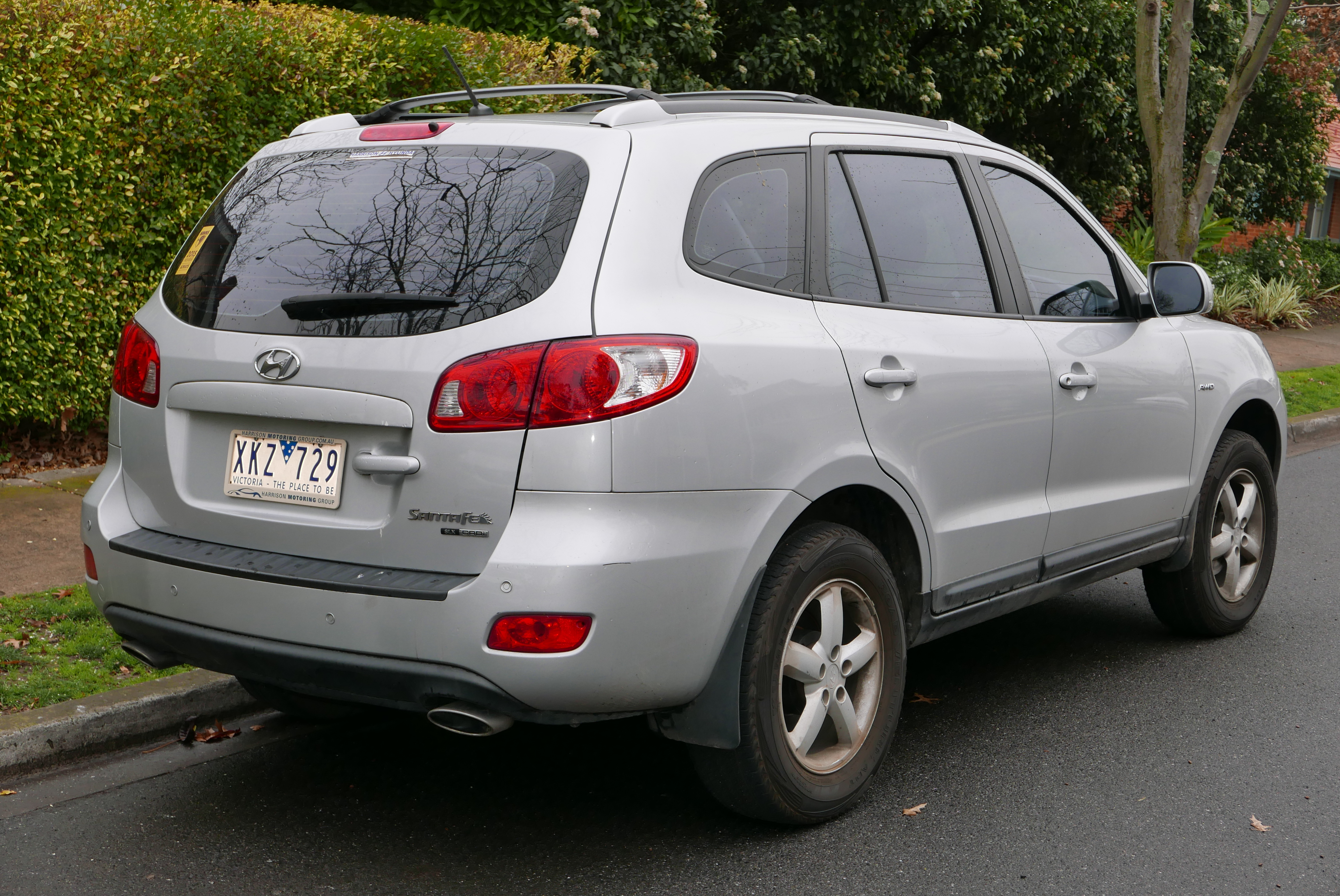
2009 Hyundai Santa Fe SLX CRDi (Australia)

In the United States, the new generation was offered in GLS, SE, and Limited versions. The new Santa Fe saw the return of a manual transmission, but only when mated with the 2,656 cc (2.656 L; 162.1 cu in) V6. The 3,342 cc (3.342 L; 203.9 cu in) V6 (a retuned version of the same engine found in the Sonata) was standard on the SE and Limited and comes only with a 5-speed automatic. Both 2WD and AWD models with a 3.3 L have a fuel economy of 19 mpg_{‑US} (12 L/100 km; 23 mpg_{‑imp}) city and 24 mpg_{‑US} (9.8 L/100 km; 29 mpg_{‑imp}) highway. The 2.2 L diesel engine (not available in the US) with 114 kW (155 PS; 153 hp) has mixed cycle of 7.2l and a city cycle of 8.0l. The 4WD is a Borg-Warner Torque Management device, which diverts power to the wheels with best grip according to the amount of slip. If the front wheels spin slightly, 10% of the torque will transfer to the rear axle. If the front wheels start to slip a lot, 50% of the torque will transfer to the rear axle. Body lean in turns, a problem with the previous generation, has been reduced in the new Santa Fe. Both road and wind noise have also been reduced.

Newly standard on the latest iteration of the Santa Fe are safety features the previous model lacked or charged as extra. Electronic stability control (ESC), side-curtain airbags for all seating rows, a tire pressure monitor, active front head restraints, and anti-lock brakes are all standard. A heated windshield wiper grid located in the front wipers' 'park' position helps to thaw ice buildup on the blades in colder climates. Some features like the tailgate flip glass and the lower body cladding were not integrated into the new model.

The interior has been upgraded with blue-lit dashboard controls (unlike the green colour used in other Hyundai models), a gated shifter pattern, illuminated cup holders, and higher quality leather on Limited models. The rear seat head restraints caused visibility problems in the previous model due to their size. The new style features 'shingled' head rests that when lowered completely, sit flush with the top of the seat, helping to maximize rear visibility. The middle rear seating position comes with its own head restraint and a three-point seat belt built in. LATCH child seat anchors are also standard, and an optional 50/50 third row seat allows Santa Fe to seat seven passengers.

Pricing remained competitive despite the upward move in size and feature content.

In Malaysia, Hyundai Santa Fe is available as a complete knock down model rebadged as Inokom Santa Fe. The Inokom Santa Fe is only available in CRDi 2.2-litre, diesel inline-four or a 2.7-litre V6.

The second-generation Hyundai Santa Fe was awarded 2008 Consumer Reports "top pick" and was among the top 10 vehicles for 2008 unveiled in the magazine's issue. The magazine's annual ratings, based on road tests and predicted safety and reliability, are considered highly influential among consumers.

=== 2008 ===
For 2008, only minor changes were applied to the Santa Fe. A navigation system made by LG was offered and the Infinity sound system and the power glass sunroof were made standard on Limited models. The non-metallic white paint trim was dropped, leaving the pearl white as the only white colour available on the Santa Fe.

=== 2009 ===
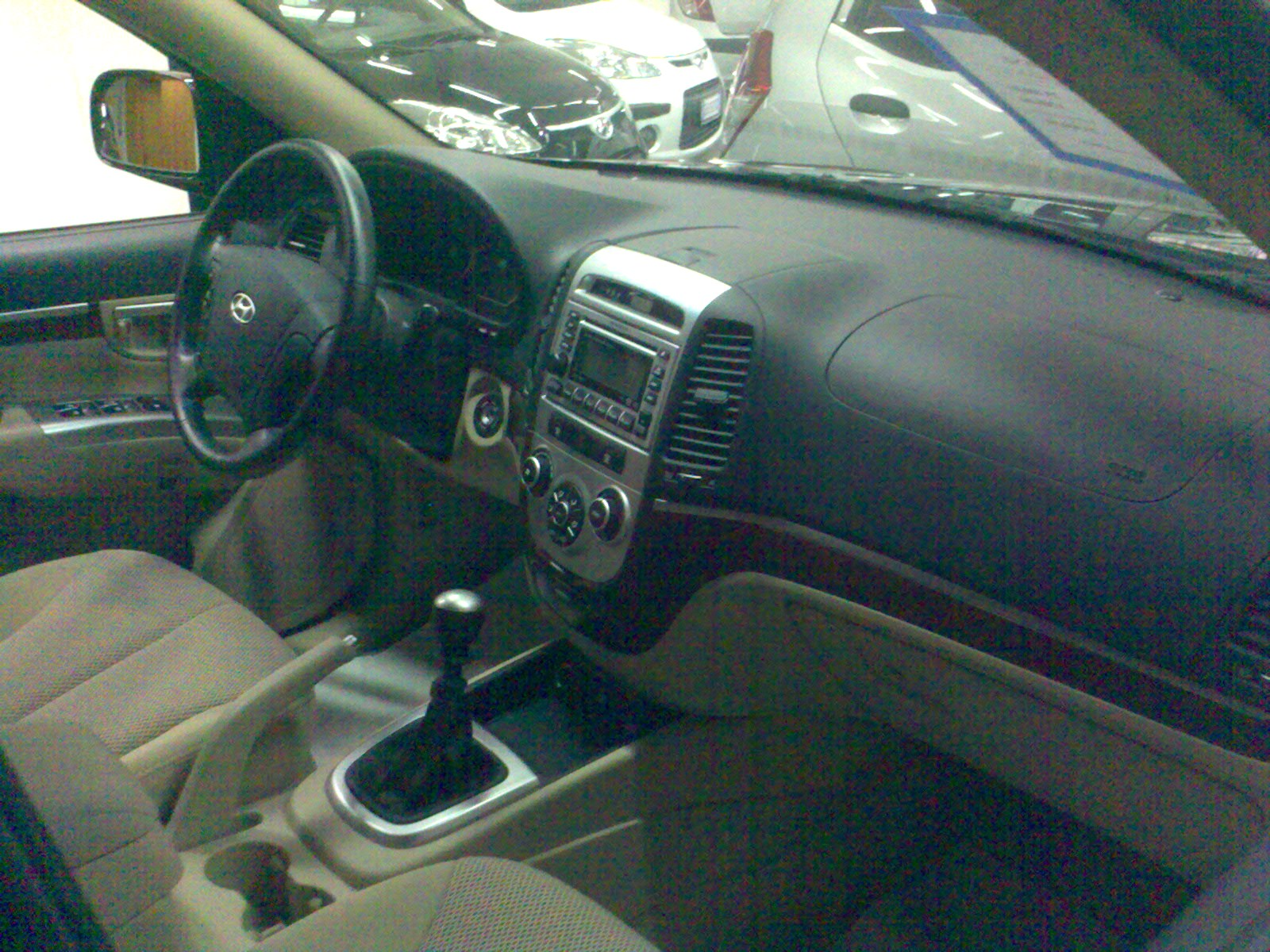
Interior

2009 saw only minor changes for the Santa Fe. New mirror indicators were introduced, except on US-built models. The 16" wheels on the base GLS model (USA specification) were dropped and replaced with black steel wheels and plastic covers. Additionally, the GLS received black plastic mirrors as opposed to the body-coloured mirrors of the higher-tier SE and Limited models. This cut in equipment was rumored to be a countermeasure to offset the price increase of offering an iPod plug-in for the stereo system. Because of the black mirrors and wheel covers, the additional cost of the iPod adapter was negated, leaving the base price of the vehicle unchanged.

The Santa Fe topped the "20 least expensive 2009 vehicles to insure" list by Insure.com. According to research, the Santa Fe is the least expensive vehicle to insure. Low rates tend to reflect a vehicle's safety.

December 2009 saw the introduction of a more economical 'R' series piezo electric injector-equipped 2.2-litre turbo-diesel four-cylinder engine producing 145 kW (197 PS; 194 hp) (up 27 per cent) at 3800 rpm and 436 N⋅m (322 lb⋅ft) of torque at 1800 rpm; 421 N⋅m (311 lb⋅ft) for the manual.

=== 2010 ===
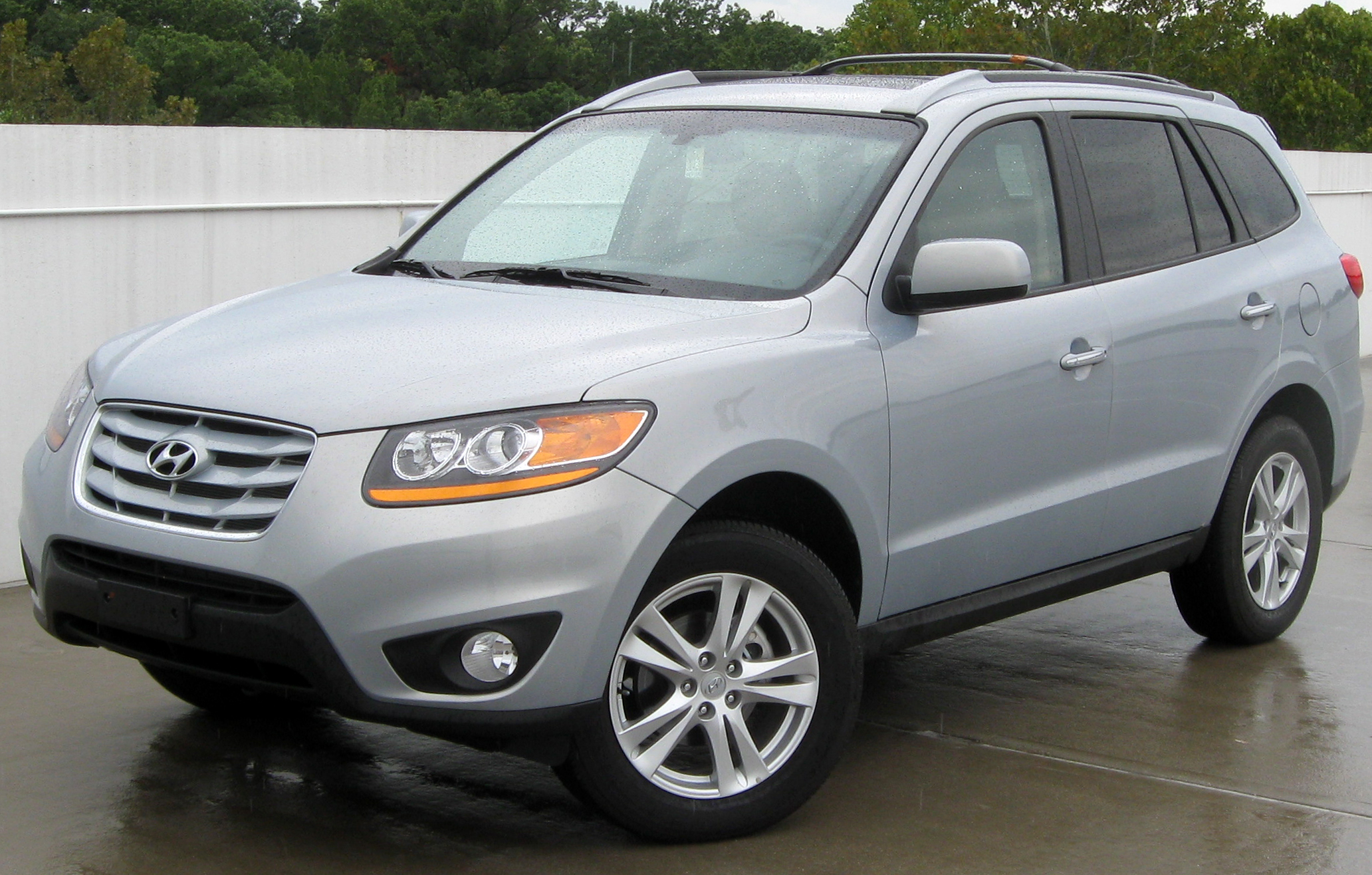
2010 Hyundai Santa Fe Limited (US)

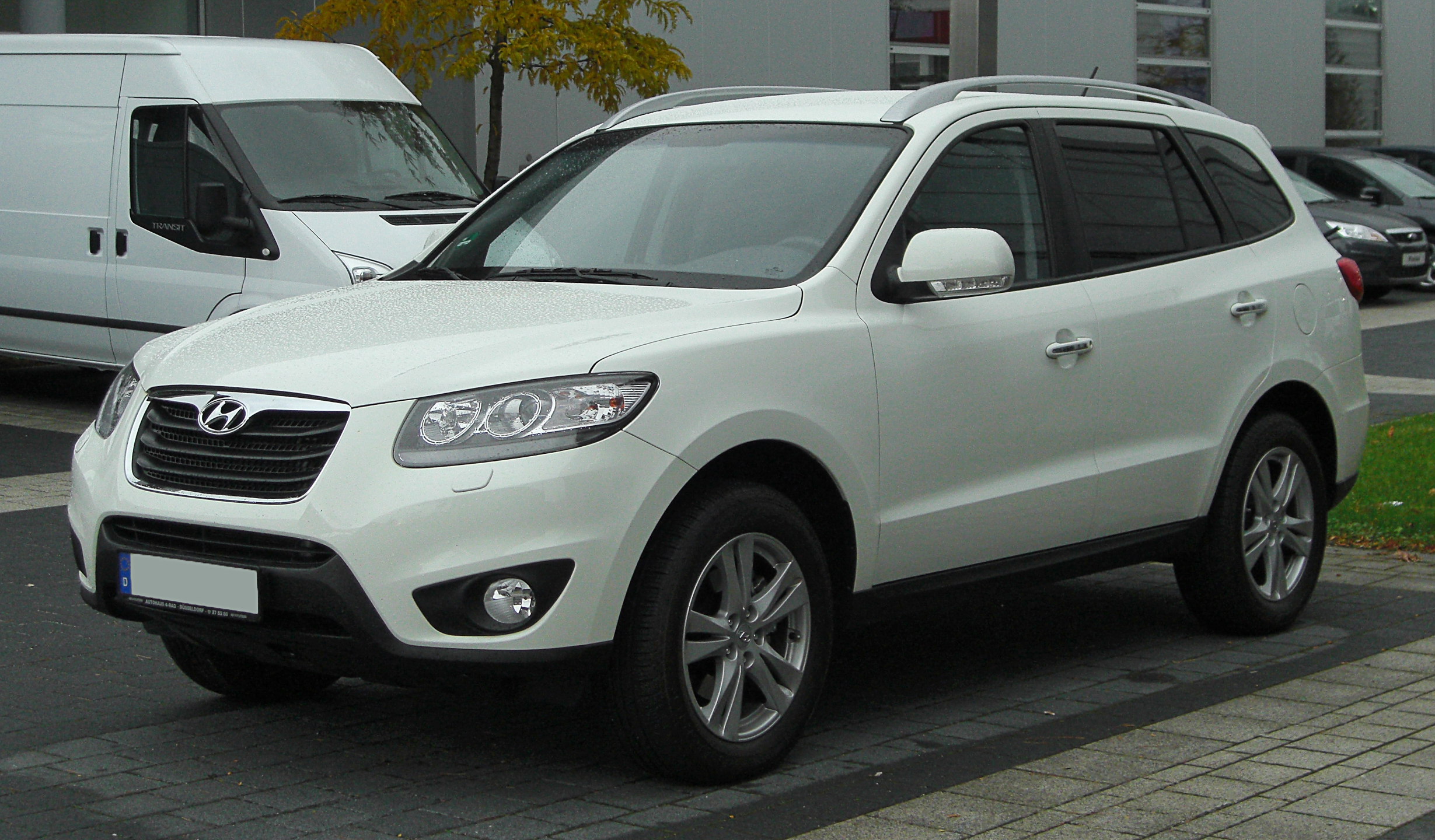

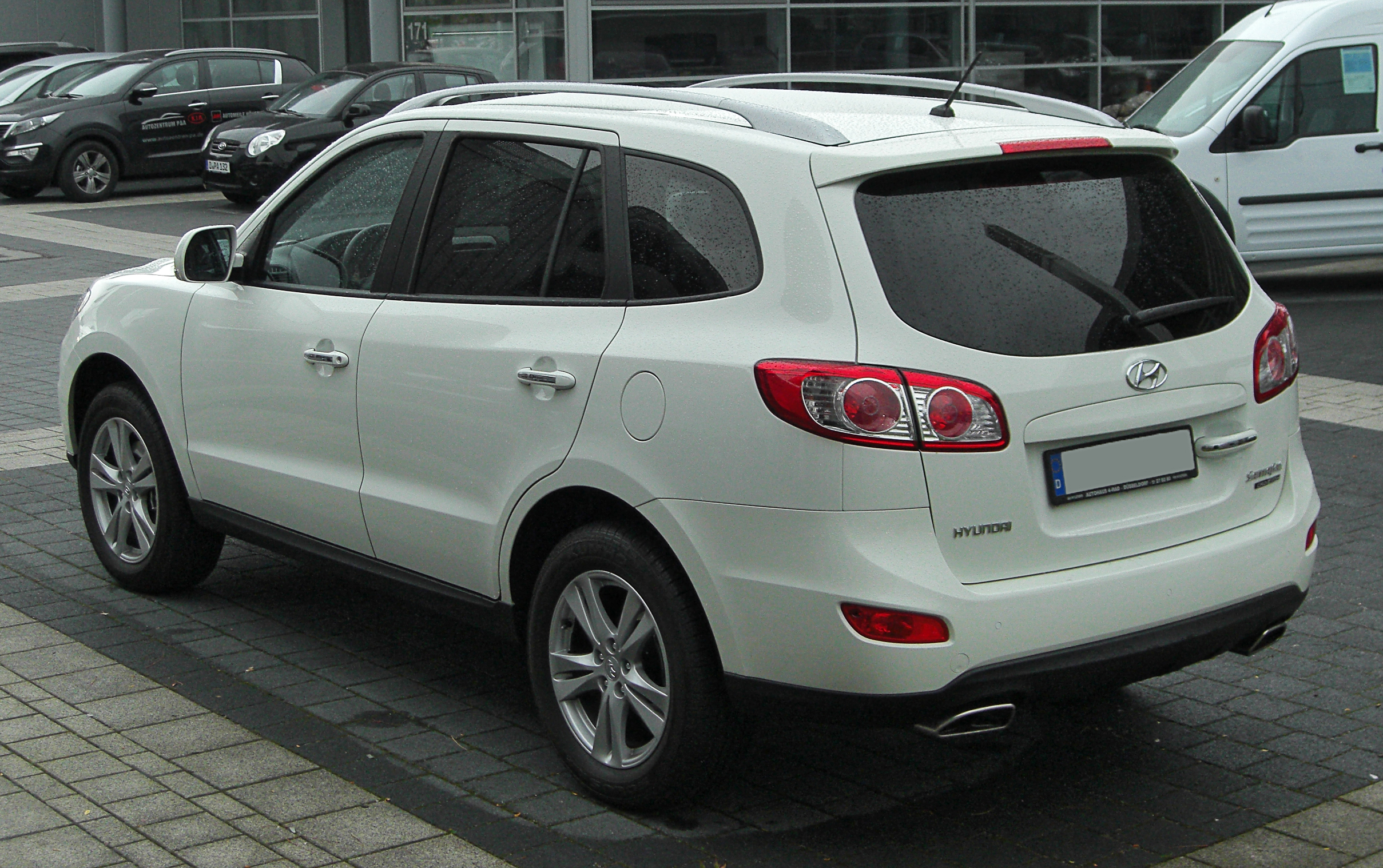
Hyundai Santa Fe (Germany; facelift)

A mid-cycle refresh designed in Germany for the Santa Fe was implemented for the 2010 model year. The grille includes horizontal and vertical gridded bars as opposed to the horizontal two-bar grille on previous models, and grilles became body-coloured instead of black. New rear tail lights include all-red tail light covers with extensive chrome outlay, and new 5 split-spoke alloy wheels have replaced the previous 5- and 6-spoke wheels. All Santa Fes include standard Bluetooth hands-free phone connectivity and steering wheel audio controls, new darker wood trim, and metallic steering wheel inlay. Gauges have been designed with a new lettering and numbering typeface and backlight design. A new touch-screen navigation system with rear back-up camera was became available. For the US market, the optional third row seat has been discontinued, leaving the larger Veracruz the only then sold Hyundai in the United States to seat more than five people.

Powertrain changes included a choice of the standard six-speed manual transmission or the optional six-speed automatic transmission. Engine choices include a 2.4-litre four-cylinder and a 3.5-litre V6 engine. The latter engine is also used in the Kia Sorento. Both engines generate greater power while obtaining greater fuel economy than previous engine models. Sales began in early January 2010.

=== 2011 ===
Only minor changes were applied to the Santa Fe for 2011. The 1050-watt Infinity sound system became standard on Limited trim whereas it had only been previously bundled with the optional navigation system. Five new colours were added, as well, including Moonstone Silver, Frost White Pearl, Sonoran Red, Mineral Gray, and Espresso Brown.

On 1 September 2010, North American production of the Santa Fe shifted to Kia's new West Point, Georgia assembly plant for the 2011 model year. This was done to free up production capacity at the Alabama plant for the new Sonata and new Elantra. The Santa Fe fills the void left for a Kia-built Hyundai sold in the United States & Canada after Hyundai ended production of the Entourage minivan in 2009. Kia, however, is 49.2% owned by Hyundai.

=== 2012 ===
The Santa Fe only received minor changes for 2012: The all-body coloured grille (in North American markets) was straightened and received chrome accents while the textured strip below the headlights was changed from amber to clear. The interior received a new shift knob and downhill brake assist was added. The 2012 model was discontinued by the end of the year, therefore ending production of the second generation Santa Fe.

=== Santa Fe Blue Hybrid ===
There is a Hyundai Santa Fe Blue Hybrid that is powered by petrol engine coupled to a 30 kW (41 PS; 40 hp) electric motor. The Santa Fe blue Hybrid uses a 270 V lithium polymer battery.

=== Recall ===
Hyundai has recalled almost 200,000 Santa Fe SUVs from the 2007 to 2009 model years, because the front passenger airbags may not deploy in a crash due to a possible problem with the occupant classification system. The system gauges the size of a passenger and bases on that whether an airbag should be deployed. A software update rectifies the issue.

=== Safety ===
The second-generation Santa Fe earned "Top Safety Pick" award by the Insurance Institute for Highway Safety. It also received maximum 5 star safety ratings by the National Highway Traffic Safety Administration (NHTSA). The Hyundai Santa Fe earned maximum five star safety rating from Australasian New Car Assessment Program (ANCAP).

The second-generation Hyundai Santa Fe topped the "20 least expensive 2009 vehicles to insure" list by Insure.com.

Euro NCAP test results* Hyundai Santa Fe 2.2 CRDi GLS (LHD) (2006)
Test	Score	Rating
Adult occupant:	29	4 /5 stars
Child occupant:	36	3 /5 stars
Pedestrian:	0	0 /4 stars

ANCAP test results* Hyundai Santa Fe variants with side & curtain airbags (2006)
Test	Score
Overall	4 /5 stars
Frontal offset	12.34/16
Side impact	16/16
Pole	1/2
Seat belt reminders	0/3
Whiplash protection	Not Assessed
Pedestrian protection	Poor
Electronic stability control	Optional

ANCAP test results* Hyundai Santa Fe 2.2L diesel and 2.4L petrol engine variants (2009)
Test	Score
Overall	5 /5 stars
Frontal offset	13.34/16
Side impact	16/16
Pole	2/2
Seat belt reminders	2/3
Whiplash protection	Not Assessed
Pedestrian protection	Poor
Electronic stability control	Standard

=== Marketing ===
Advertising Standards Bureau of Australia banned a Santa Fe TV commercial titled 'Restless' or 'Toddler' in 2007, which ASB argued that it promotes an illegal driving activity: an underaged person (a toddler) driving a car. He also picked up a hitchhiking toddler girl and both were wearing seatbelts instead of approved child restraints which also breached safety recommendations. The ad was produced by Kim Thorp and Howard Greive from Assignment Group NZ and directed by Tony Williams from Sydney Film Company, with post via Frame Set + Match, Sydney. The ad itself won the 2006 Fair Go Ad Awards in Best Ad Award category, and was also nominated in the top five in the Worst Ad category.

== Third generation (DM/NC; 2012) ==
Third generation
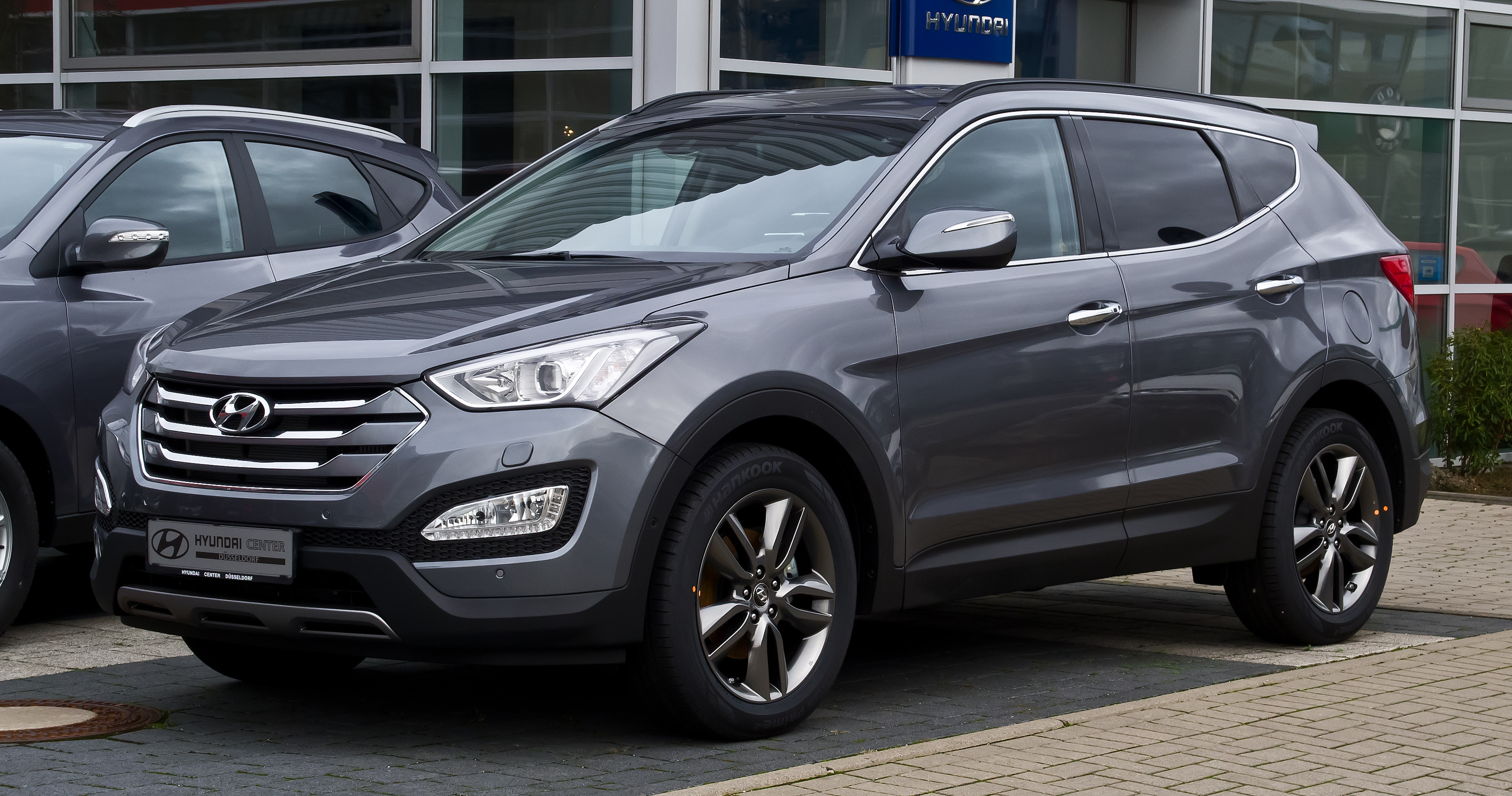
- Pre-facelift (SWB)

Overview
- Model code: DM (short-wheelbase); NC (long-wheelbase)
- Also called: Hyundai Santa Fe Sport (SWB model, North America); Hyundai Maxcruz (LWB model, South Korea); Hyundai Grand Santa Fe (LWB model); Hyundai Santa Fe XL (LWB model, North America); Inokom Santa Fe (Malaysia)
- Production: April 2012 – February 2018 (SWB); January 2013 – November 2018 (LWB)
- Model years: 2013–2018 (SWB); 2013–2020 (LWB)
- Assembly: South Korea: Ulsan; United States: Montgomery, Alabama (HMMA); West Point, Georgia (KMMG); China: Beijing (Beijing Hyundai); Malaysia: Kulim (Inokom); Vietnam: Ninh Bình (HTMV); Egypt: Cairo (Ghabbour Group); India: Chennai (HMIL); Russia: Kaliningrad (Avtotor); Algeria: Tiaret (TMC); Taiwan: Hukou (Sanyang Motor)
- Designer: Jae-Hyun Lee; Hee-Joon An, Myung-jin Jung and Hae-Ryun Sohn (facelift)

Body and chassis
- Platform: Hyundai-Kia Y6
- Related: Kia Sorento

Powertrain
- Engine: Petrol: 2.0 L Theta II T-GDi I4; 2.4 L Theta II MPi I4; 2.4 L Theta II GDi I4; 3.3 L Lambda II MPi V6; 3.3 L Lambda II GDi V6; Diesel: 2.0 L R II CRDi I4; 2.2 L R II CRDi I4
- Transmission: 6-speed manual 6-speed automatic 8-speed automatic

Dimensions
- Wheelbase: 2,700 mm (106.3 in) (SWB); 2,800 mm (110.2 in) (LWB)
- Length: 4,690–4,700 mm (184.6–185.0 in) (SWB); 4,905–4,915 mm (193.1–193.5 in) (LWB)
- Width: 1,880 mm (74.0 in) (SWB); 1,885 mm (74.2 in) (LWB)
- Height: 1,680–1,690 mm (66.1–66.5 in) (SWB); 1,690–1,700 mm (66.5–66.9 in) (LWB)
- Curb weight: 1,727–1,915 kg (3,807–4,222 lb) (SWB); 1,749–2,057 kg (3,856–4,535 lb) (LWB)

Chronology
- Predecessor: Hyundai Veracruz (for LWB)
- Successor: Hyundai Palisade (for LWB)

Hyundai launched a redesign of the Santa Fe on 14 February 2012. Unveiled at the 2012 New York International Auto Show on 4 April, the third generation Santa Fe features two wheelbase variants: shorter 5-seat Sport variant (7-seat is optional in several markets) and the long-wheelbase version (called Santa Fe XL in Canada) with three rows of seats and available seating for six or seven passengers. Both models feature the new "Storm Edge" design prototype, eventually launch on all other models, and feature refreshed Santa Fe unibody crossover platform.

=== Short-wheelbase version (DM) ===
The short-wheelbase version is marketed as the Santa Fe Sport in the United States and Canada, and simply Santa Fe in other regions. While the Santa Fe Sport is solely available in two-row in North America, a third-row seat option is available as standard or optional in most regions outside North America.

The 2013 Santa Fe Sport models arrived with an all four-cylinder engine lineup. The standard engine is a 2.4 L developing 190 horsepower (142 kW), with a 264 hp (268 PS; 197 kW) 2.0 L turbo four on offer. Front-wheel drive is standard, with all-wheel drive being optional. The Santa Fe Sport has Hyundai's Torque Vectoring Cornering Control feature for upgraded drive performance. Both engines shift through a six-speed automatic transmission (already found in the Azera sedan), returning up to 33 mpg_{‑US} (7.1 L/100 km; 40 mpg_{‑imp}) for the naturally aspirated model and 31 mpg_{‑US} (7.6 L/100 km; 37 mpg_{‑imp}) for the Santa Fe Sport 2.0T model.

The Korean-spec Santa Fe was launched in Asia since 19 April 2012, in short wheel base form with 7-seater capacity. Available engine types are a 2.0L E-VGT R-Line and 2.2L E-VGT R-Line diesel engines.

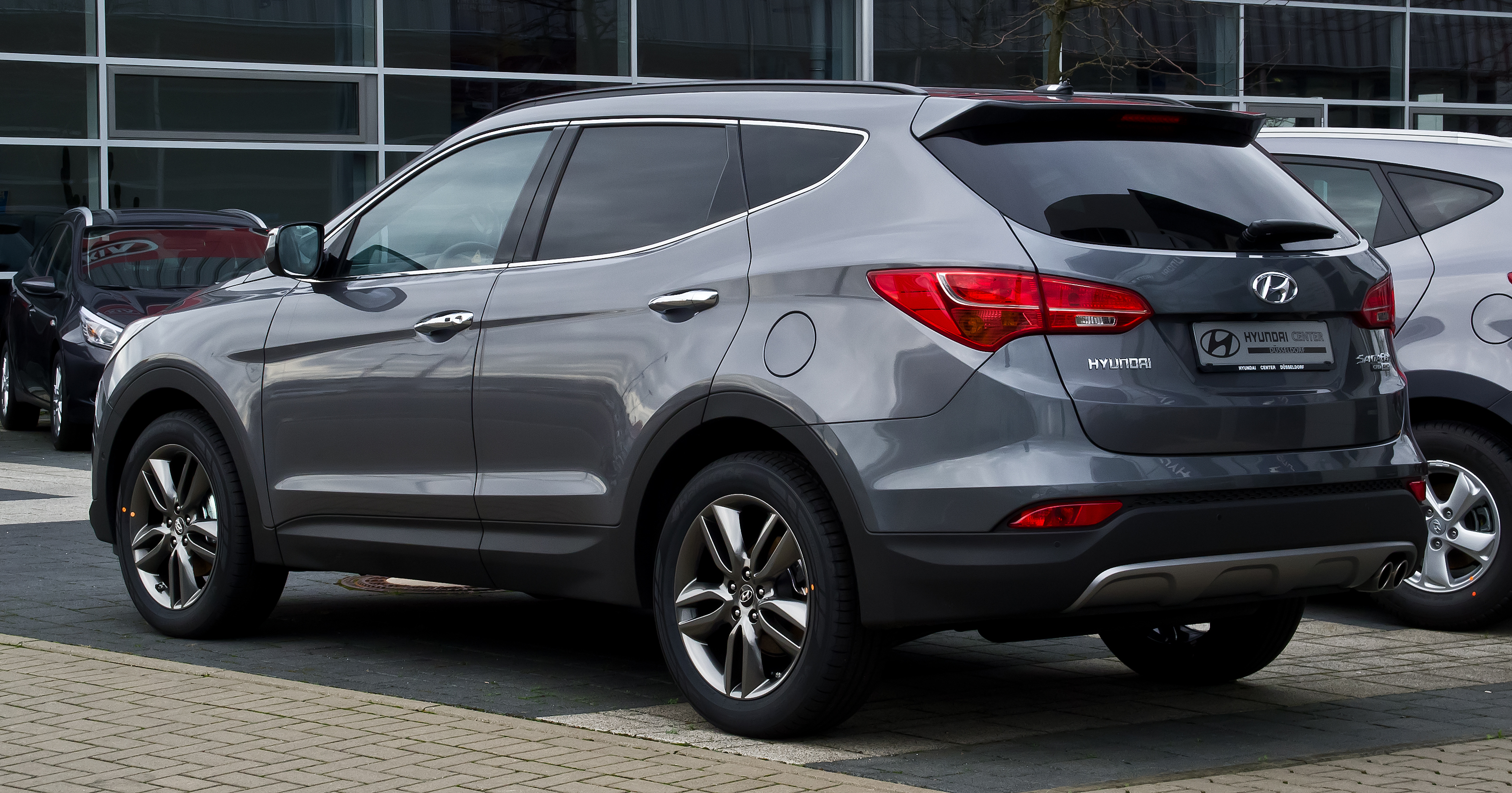
Rear view (pre-facelift, SWB)

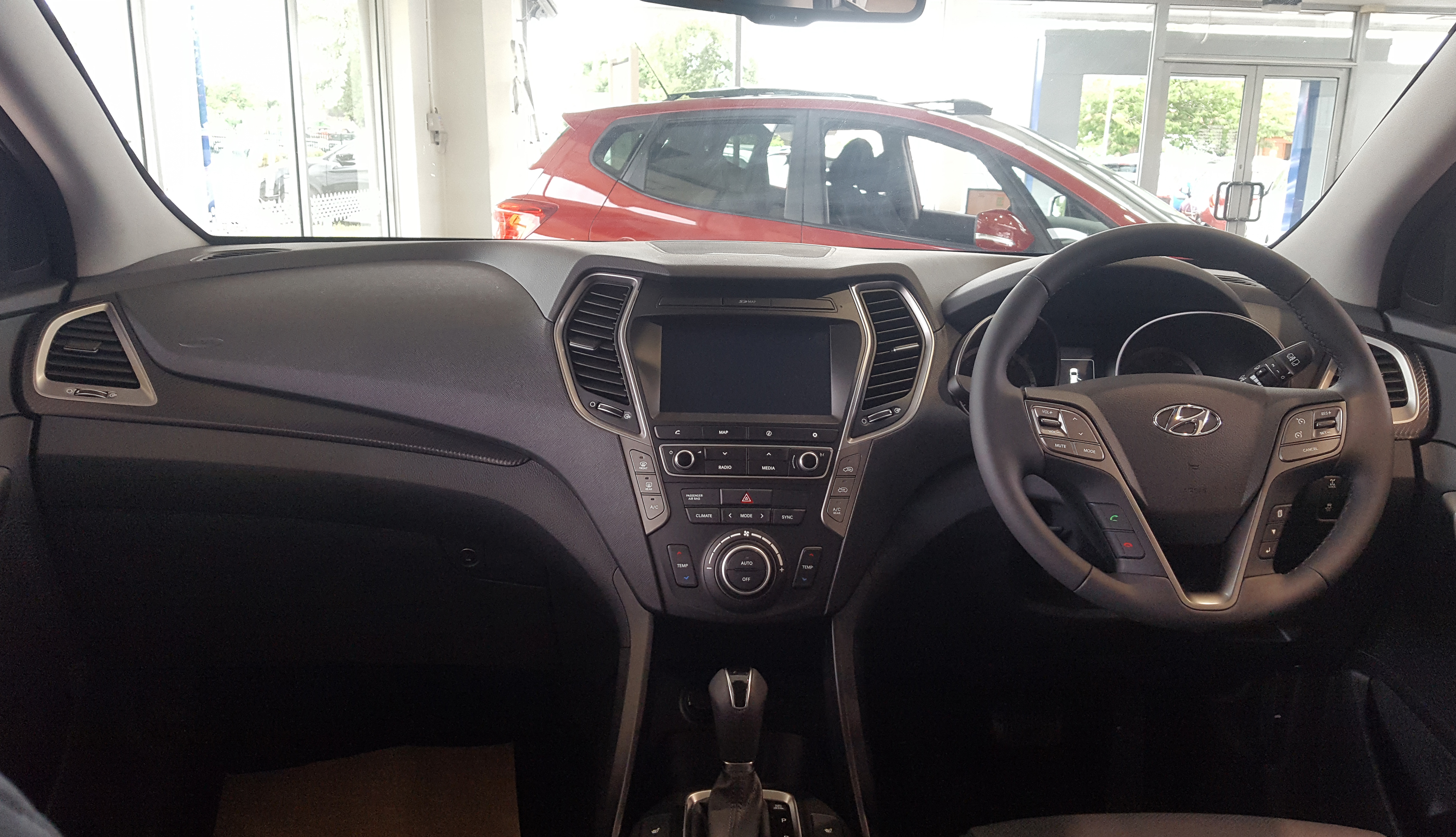
Interior

==== Facelift ====
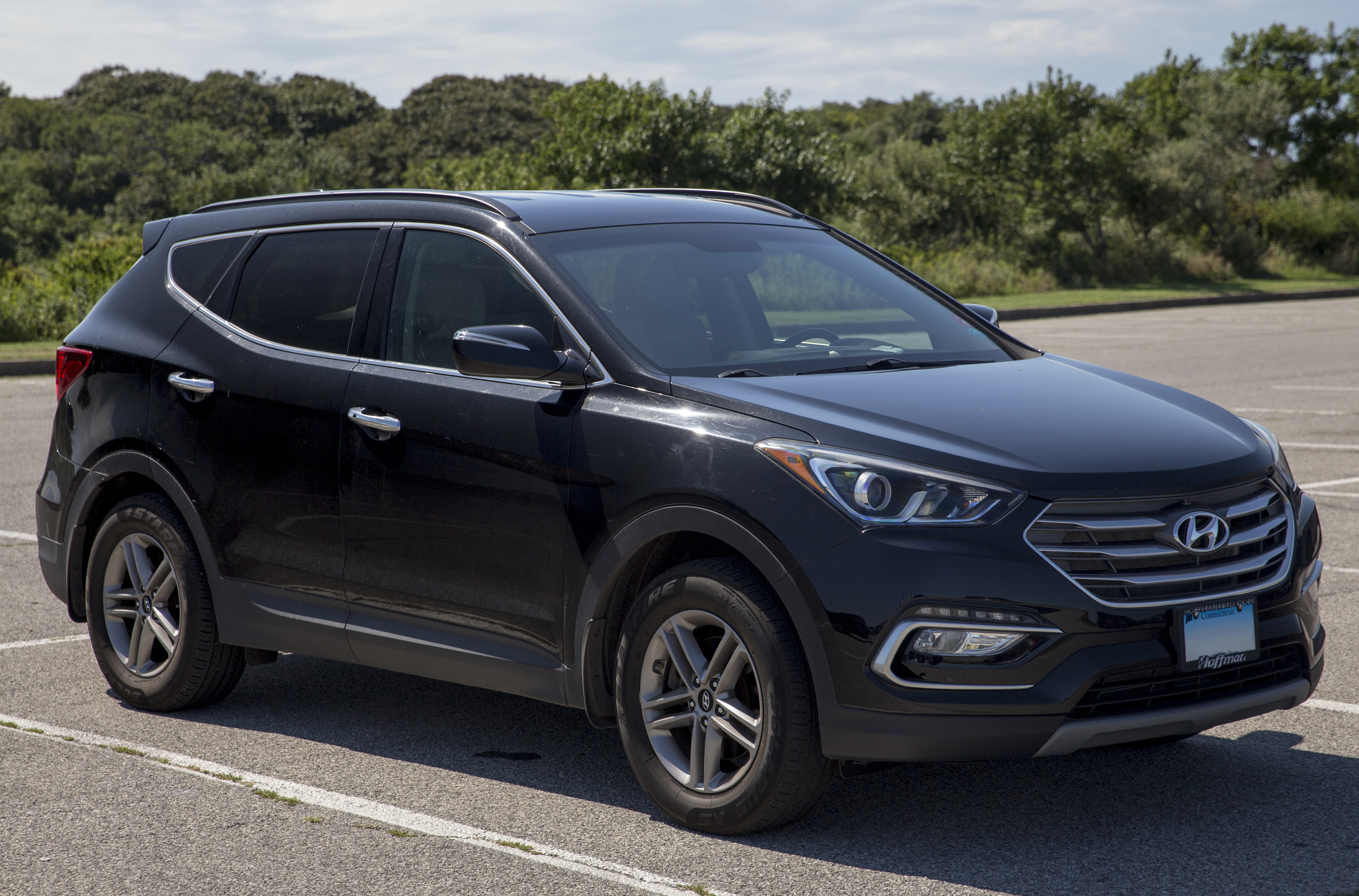
Facelift (Santa Fe Sport)

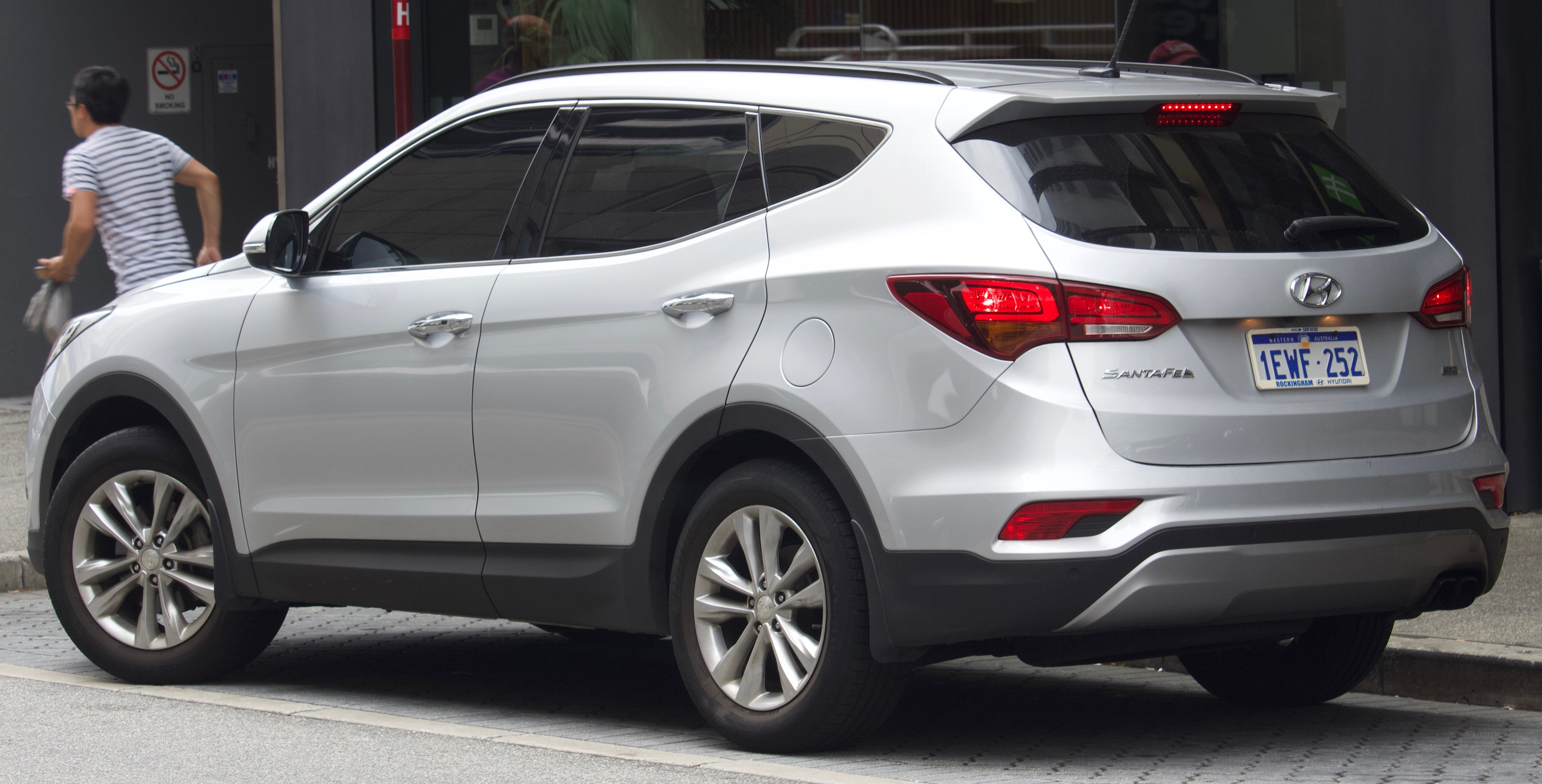
Rear view (facelift, SWB)

==== North America ====
The Santa Fe Sport went on sale in June 2012 as a 2013 model. It was available with two engines, and multiple packages that add many features. Engine choices are either a 2.4-litre petrol GDi engine, or a 2.0-litre turbocharged engine, offered as the 2.4 and 2.0T trim levels respectively. In Canada, only the 2.0T engine was available.

For the 2017 model, both the LWB Santa Fe and Santa Fe Sport has received a facelift with restyled headlights and tail lights. In the domestic Korean market, this facelifted model was named "Santa Fe The Prime".

==== Powertrain ====
Santa Fe
Model	Year	Transmission	Power	Torque	0–100 km/h (official)	Top speed
Petrol
Theta II 2.0 T-GDi	2012–2015	6-speed automatic	268 PS (197 kW; 264 hp) @ 6,000 rpm	37.2 kg⋅m (365 N⋅m; 269 lbf⋅ft) @ 1,750–3,500 rpm		
Theta II 2.0 T-GDi	2015–2018	6-speed automatic	240–243 PS (177–179 kW; 237–240 hp) @ 6,000 rpm	36 kg⋅m (353 N⋅m; 260 lbf⋅ft) @ 1,450–3,500 rpm		
Theta II 2.4 MPi	2012–2018	6-speed automatic	176 PS (129 kW; 174 hp) @ 6,000 rpm	23.1 kg⋅m (227 N⋅m; 167 lbf⋅ft) @ 4,000 rpm	10.9s (FWD); 11.6s (AWD)	190 km/h (118 mph)
Theta II 2.4 GDi	2012–2018	6-speed automatic	191–193 PS (140–142 kW; 188–190 hp) @ 6,300 rpm	24.6–25.0 kg⋅m (241–245 N⋅m; 178–181 lbf⋅ft) @ 4,250 rpm	10.0s (FWD); 10.5s (AWD)	190 km/h (118 mph)
Lambda II 3.3 MPi	2012–2018	6-speed automatic	270 PS (199 kW; 266 hp) @ 6,400 rpm	32.4 kg⋅m (318 N⋅m; 234 lbf⋅ft) @ 5,300 rpm	8.5s	210 km/h (130 mph)
Lambda II 3.3 GDi	2012–2018	6-speed automatic	286–294 PS (210–216 kW; 282–290 hp) @ 6,400 rpm	34.4 kg⋅m (337 N⋅m; 249 lbf⋅ft) @ 5,200 rpm		210 km/h (130 mph)
Diesel
2.0 R II CRDi	2012–2018	6-speed automatic	150 PS (110 kW; 148 hp) @ 4,000 rpm	39.1–40.8 kg⋅m (383–400 N⋅m; 283–295 lbf⋅ft) @ 1,750–2,500 rpm	11.0s (FWD); 11.3s (AWD)	187 km/h (116 mph)
2.2 R II CRDi	2012–2015	6-speed manual	200 PS (147 kW; 197 hp) @ 3,800 rpm	43.0 kg⋅m (422 N⋅m; 311 lbf⋅ft) @ 1,800–2,500 rpm		
2.2 R II CRDi	2012–2018	6-speed automatic	193–200 PS (142–147 kW; 190–197 hp) @ 3,800 rpm	45.0 kg⋅m (441 N⋅m; 325 lbf⋅ft) @ 1,750–2,750 rpm	8.7s (FWD); 9.0s (AWD)	203 km/h (126 mph)

=== Long-wheelbase version (NC) ===
The long-wheelbase variant was released in South Korea as the Maxcruz on March 7, 2013. The longer Santa Fe receives a unique grille design, optional 19-inch alloy wheels, flush dual exhaust tips, and a body shape that accentuates the crossover's added passenger and cargo room hind-wise from the B-pillar.

In some markets, the long-wheelbase Santa Fe is also marketed as the Grand Santa Fe.

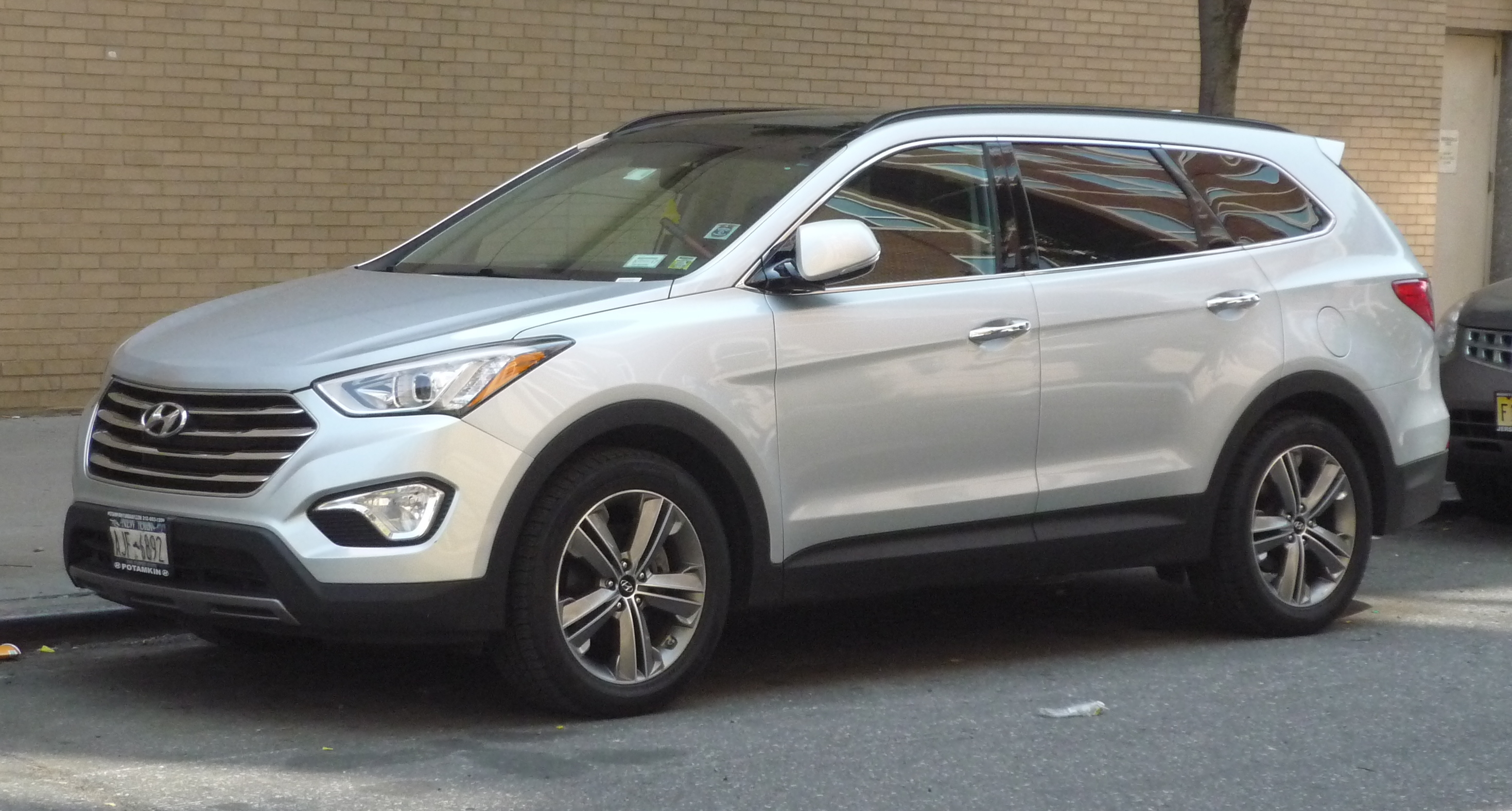
Hyundai Grand Santa Fe (pre-facelift)

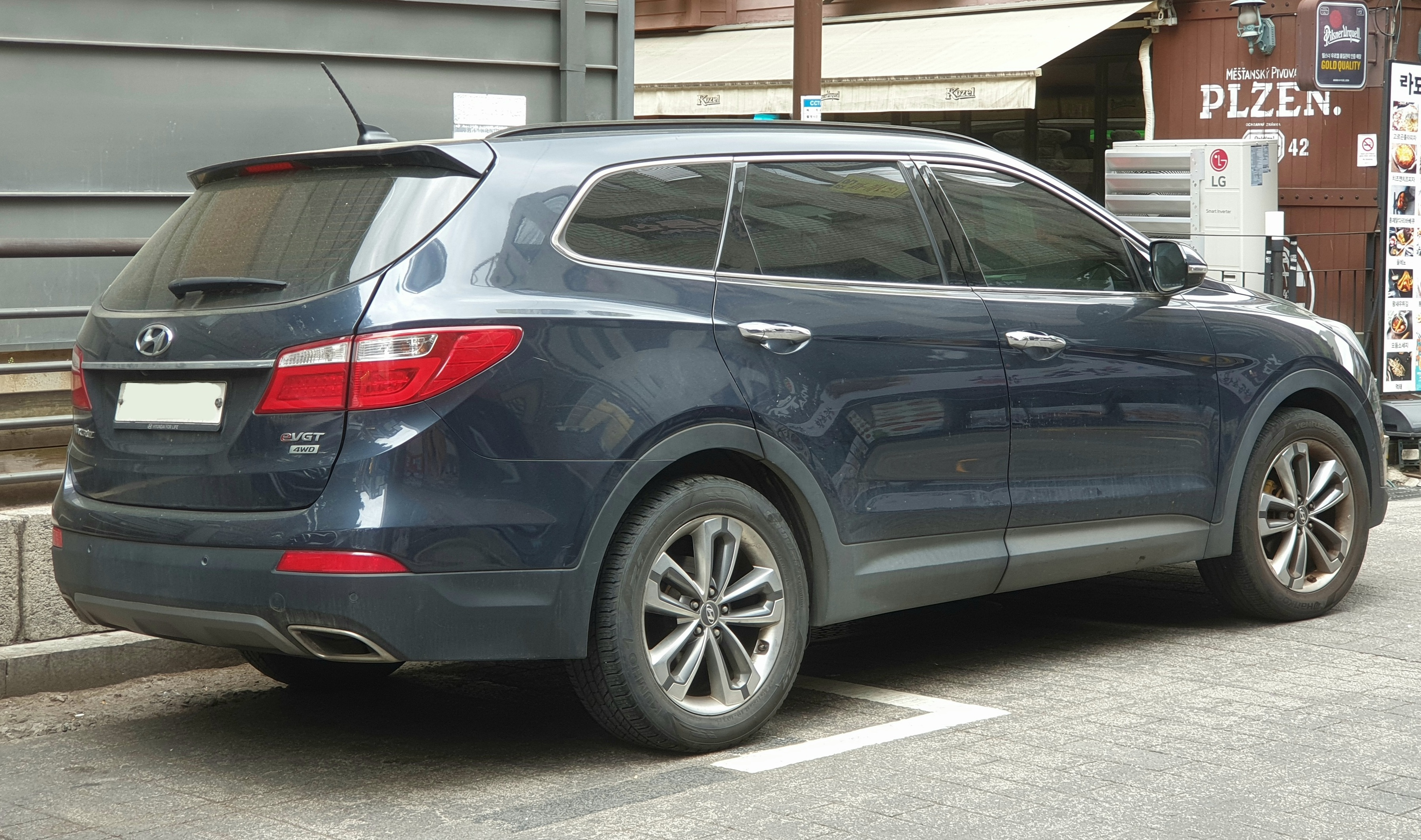
Hyundai Maxcruz (pre-facelift)

==== Facelift ====
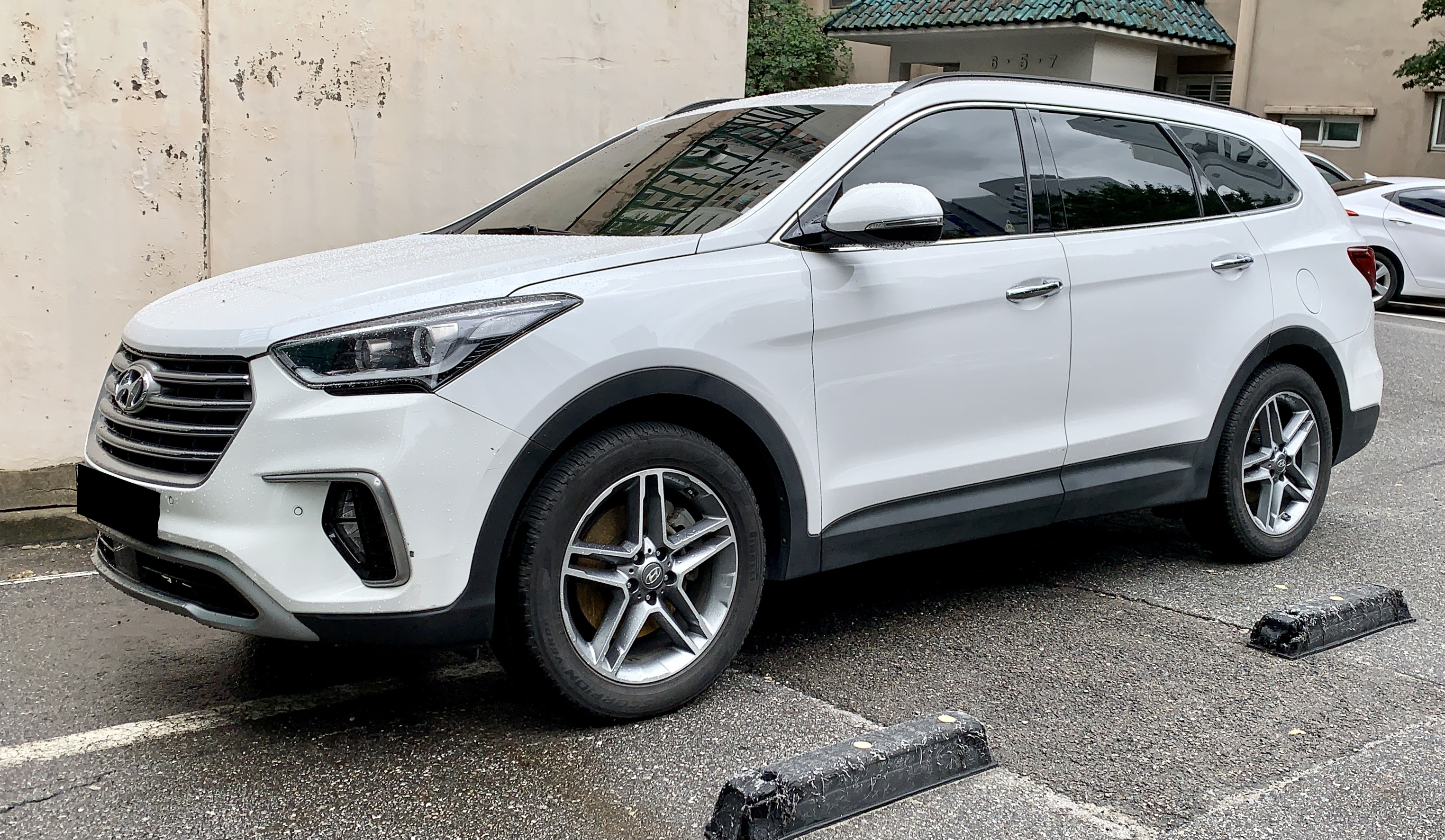
Hyundai Maxcruz

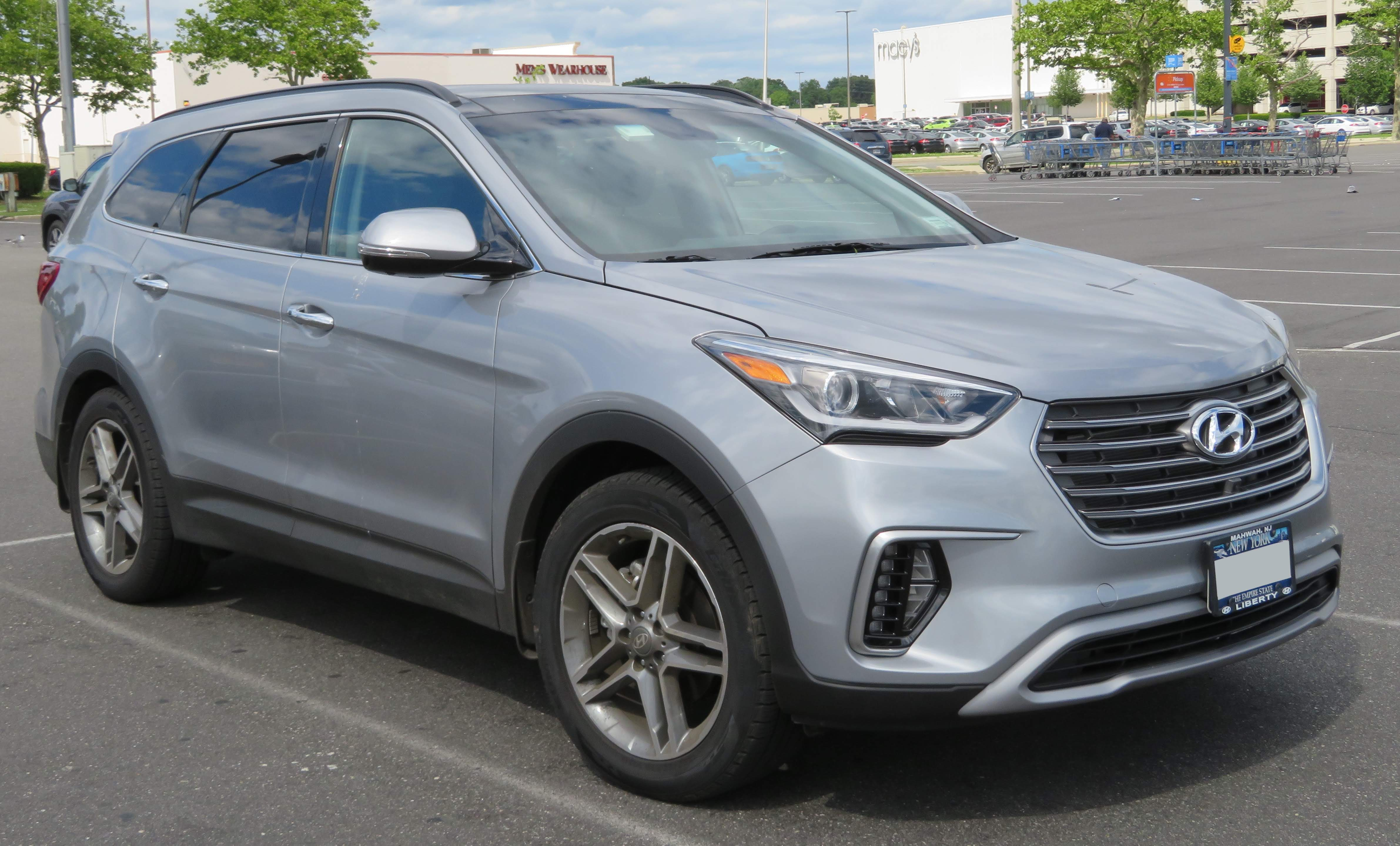
2018 Hyundai Santa Fe (facelift)

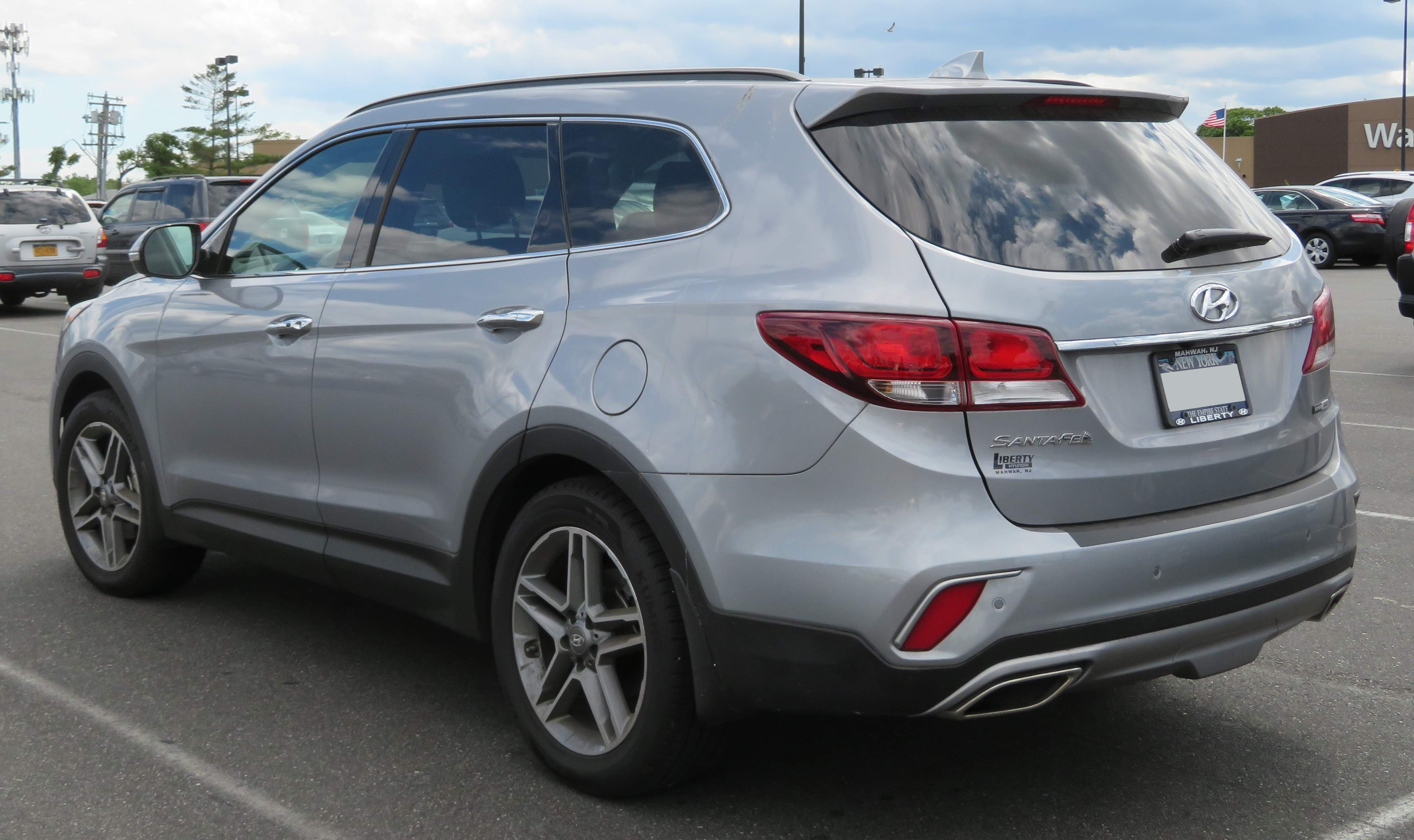
2018 Hyundai Santa Fe (facelift)

==== North America ====
The long-wheelbase is offered in North America exclusively with a 3.3-litre, 290 hp (294 PS; 216 kW) V6 petrol engine, the highest output of any vehicle in its class at the time. The Santa Fe in the U.S. is available in two distinct trim levels: the SE (called the GLS until the 2016 model year), and the Limited.

As the fourth generation Santa Fe was released in 2018 for the 2019 model year in North America, replacing the Santa Fe Sport, the long-wheelbase Santa Fe (previously simply called the Santa Fe) was renamed Santa Fe XL, in the USA (having been named that in Canada from the model's inception). In 2019, the Santa Fe XL was replaced by the Palisade.

==== Powertrain ====
Grand Santa Fe / Santa Fe XL / Maxcruz
Model	Year	Transmission	Power	Torque	0–100 km/h (official)	Top speed
Petrol
Lambda II 3.3 MPi	2013–2018	6-speed automatic	270 PS (199 kW; 266 hp) @ 6,400 rpm	32.4 kg⋅m (318 N⋅m; 234 lbf⋅ft) @ 5,300 rpm	8.7s (FWD); 8.8s (AWD)	207 km/h (129 mph)
Lambda II 3.3 GDi	2013–2018	6-speed automatic	286–294 PS (210–216 kW; 282–290 hp) @ 6,400 rpm	34.4–34.8 kg⋅m (337–341 N⋅m; 249–252 lbf⋅ft) @ 5,200 rpm	8.3s	207 km/h (129 mph)
Diesel
R II 2.2 CRDi	2013–2016	6-speed automatic	193–202 PS (142–149 kW; 190–199 hp) @ 3,800 rpm	45 kg⋅m (441 N⋅m; 325 lbf⋅ft) @ 1,750–2,750 rpm	9.9s	201 km/h (125 mph)
R II 2.2 CRDi	2016–2018	8-speed automatic	193–202 PS (142–149 kW; 190–199 hp) @ 3,800 rpm	45 kg⋅m (441 N⋅m; 325 lbf⋅ft) @ 1,750–2,750 rpm	9.9s	201 km/h (125 mph)

=== Safety ===
==== ANCAP ====
ANCAP test results* Hyundai Santa Fe (2013)
Test	Score
Overall	5 /5 stars
Frontal offset	15.63/16
Side impact	16/16
Pole	2/2
Seat belt reminders	2/3
Whiplash protection	Good
Pedestrian protection	Marginal
Electronic stability control	Standard

==== Euro NCAP ====
Euro NCAP test results* Hyundai Santa Fe 2.2 diesel, 5 seat 'Comfort' (LHD) (2012)
Test	Points	%
Overall:	5 /5 stars	
Adult occupant:	34.4	96%
Child occupant:	43.4	89%
Pedestrian:	25.5	71%
Safety assist:	6	86%

==== IIHS ====
IIHS scores (2013 model year)
Small overlap front (driver)	Marginal
Moderate overlap front (original test)	Good
Side (original test)	Good
Roof strength	Good
Head restraints and seats	Good

== Fourth generation (TM; 2018) ==
Fourth generation
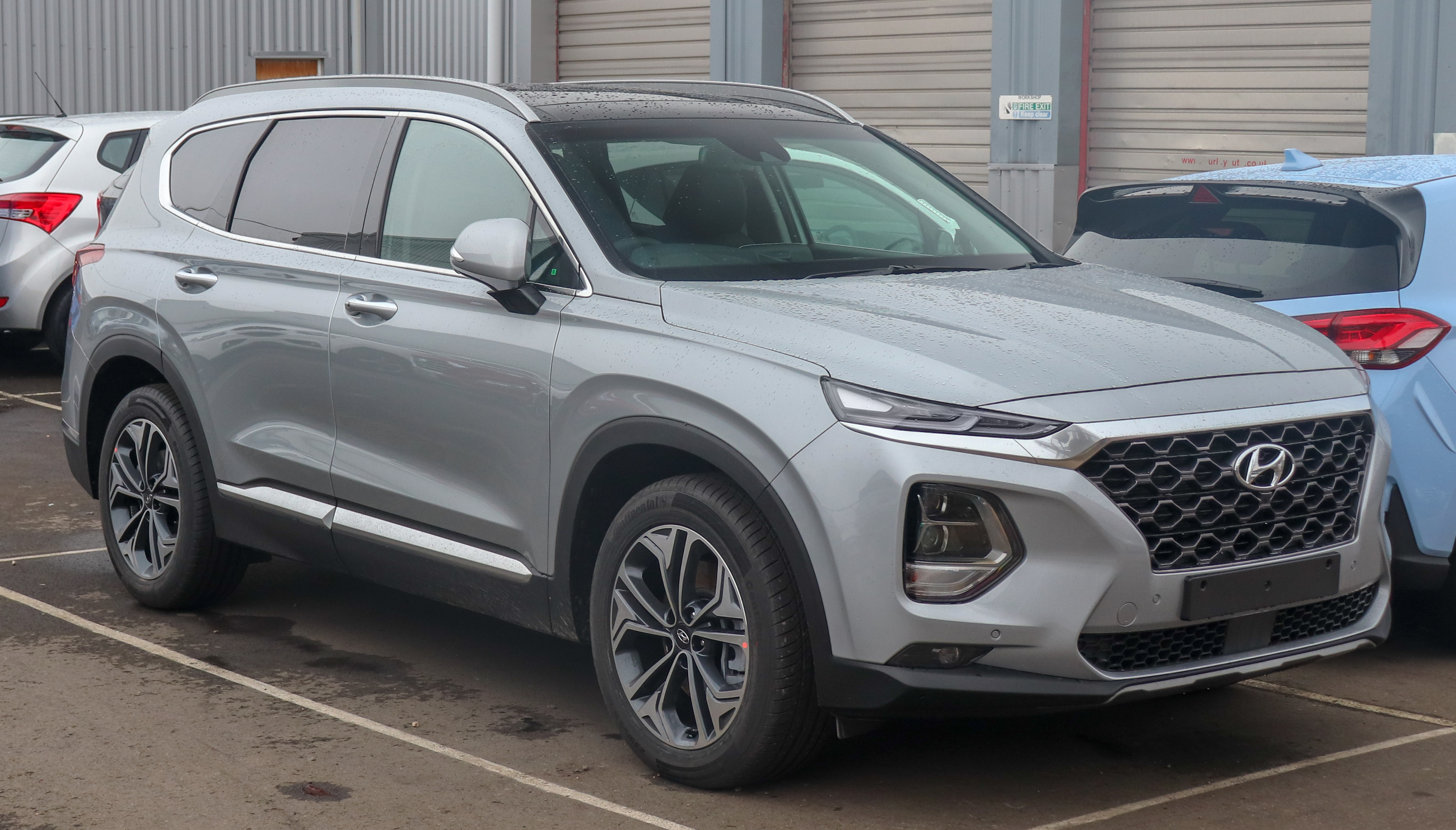

Overview
- Model code: TM
- Production: 2018–2023; 2023–present (Pakistan)
- Model years: 2019–2023
- Assembly: South Korea: Ulsan; United States: Montgomery, Alabama (HMMA); China: Beijing (Beijing Hyundai); Malaysia: Kulim (Inokom); Vietnam: Ninh Bình (HTMV); Indonesia: Cikarang (HMMI); Pakistan: Faisalabad (Hyundai Nishat)
- Designer: Hong Seok Choi

Body and chassis
- Platform: Hyundai-Kia Y7 (pre-facelift); Hyundai-Kia N3 (facelift)
- Related: Kia Sorento (MQ4)

Powertrain
- Engine: Petrol: 2.0 L Theta II T-GDi I4; 2.0 L Smartstream G2.0 T-GDi I4; 2.4 L Theta II MPi I4; 2.4 L Theta II GDi I4; 2.5 L Smartstream G2.5 MPi I4; 2.5 L Smartstream G2.5 GDi I4; 2.5 L Smartstream G2.5 T-GDi I4; 3.5 L Lambda II MPi V6; 3.5 L Smartstream G3.5 MPi V6; Petrol hybrid: 1.6 L Smartstream G1.6 T-GDi I4; Diesel: 2.0 L R II CRDi I4; 2.2 L R II CRDi I4; 2.2 L Smartstream D2.2 CRDi I4
- Electric motor: Permanent magnet synchronous (hybrid models): 44.2 kW (60 PS; 59 hp) (HEV); 66.9 kW (91 PS; 90 hp) (PHEV)
- Transmission: 6-speed manual; 6-speed automatic; 8-speed automatic; 8-speed D8LF1 DCT
- Hybrid drivetrain: Parallel hybrid Plug-in hybrid
- Battery: 1.49 kWh lithium-ion polymer (hybrid); 13.8 kWh lithium-ion polymer (PHEV)

Dimensions
- Wheelbase: 2,765 mm (108.9 in); 2,865 mm (112.8 in) (China)
- Length: 4,770 mm (187.8 in); 4,785 mm (188.4 in) (facelift); 4,930 mm (194.1 in) (China); 4,945 mm (194.7 in) (China facelift)
- Width: 1,890 mm (74.4 in); 1,900 mm (74.8 in) (facelift); 1,910 mm (75.2 in) (China)
- Height: 1,680 mm (66.1 in); 1,685 mm (66.3 in) (facelift); 1,720 mm (67.7 in) (China)
- Curb weight: 1,680–1,785 kg (3,704–3,935 lb) (2.0T); 1,635–1,870 kg (3,605–4,123 lb) (2.4L); 1,745–1,910 kg (3,847–4,211 lb) (3.5L); 1,735–1,995 kg (3,825–4,398 lb) (2.2L)

On 21 February 2018, Hyundai introduced the fourth-generation Santa Fe in South Korea, followed by the Geneva Motor Show in March. The fourth-generation Santa Fe is a two-row SUV which succeeds the previous short-wheelbase Santa Fe (marketed in North America as the Santa Fe Sport).

Compared to the third-generation short-wheelbase model, the fourth-generation model is longer by 80 mm (3.1 in), wider by 10 mm (0.4 in) with a 65 mm (2.6 in) longer wheelbase. The longer wheelbase generated more legroom for passengers in the second and third row. In the second row, legroom is increased by 38 mm (1.5 in) and the seat is 18 mm (0.7 in) higher.

Third row seats are optional in several markets, standard in some other markets and not available in regions such as North America. A new one-touch seat folding function is included for easy access to the third row seats, which has a 22 mm (0.9 in) larger headroom. However, Hyundai said the third-row is best for "occasional use". Hyundai also claimed rearward visibility is improved due to the larger rear quarter glass that is 41 percent larger than the previous generation. Cargo room is 130 litres (4.6 cu ft) with all seats rows up, 547 litres (19.3 cu ft) with the third row folded down (previously 516 litres (18.2 cu ft)), and 1,625 litres (57.4 cu ft) with the second and third seats folded (previously 1,615 litres (57.0 cu ft)).

The steering of the Santa Fe has been tuned to be more responsive, and the upgraded suspension is stiffer and angled more vertically for longer travel length. As the result, vehicle stability is enhanced while comfort, NVH and overall quietness is claimed to improve. Road noise is also reduced through the use of more sound deadening materials. A self-load-levelling suspension is optional, which continuously adjusts ride height regardless of vehicle load. The fourth-generation model is also built with extensive application of high-tensile strength steel, more than any other Hyundai vehicle during its introduction with 57 percent, or 15 percent more than the older model.

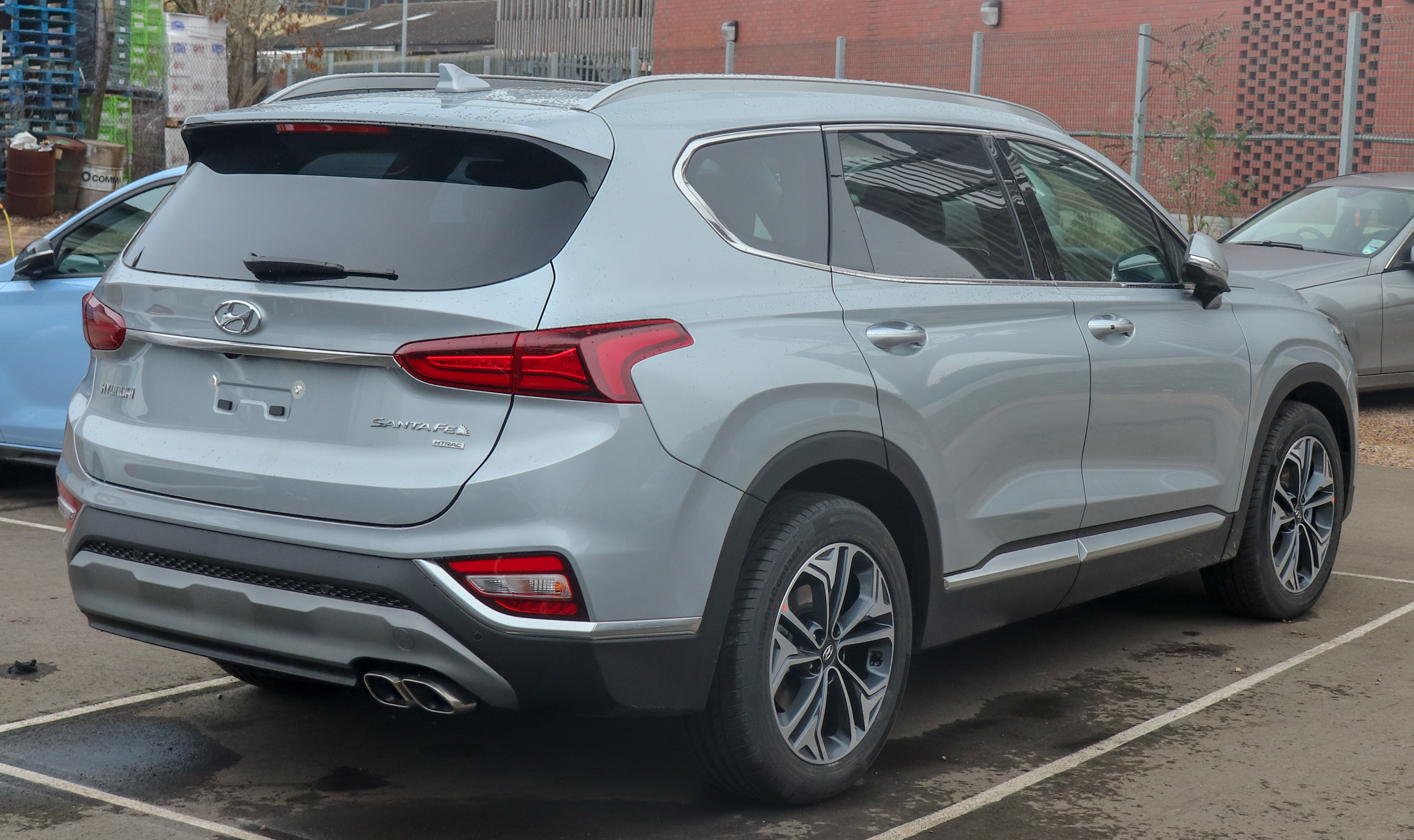
Rear view

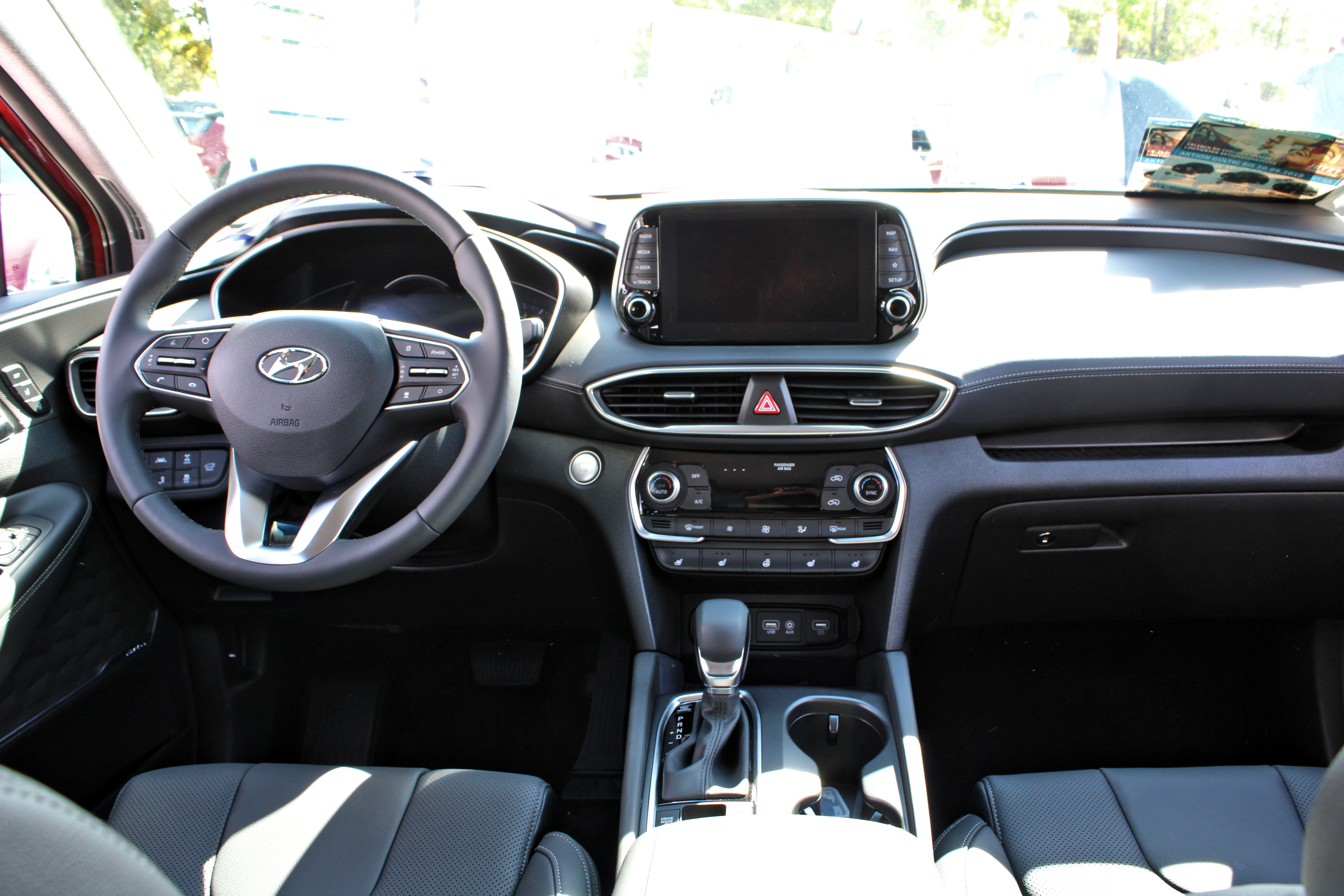
Interior

=== Facelift ===
On 3 June 2020, Hyundai revealed the facelifted Santa Fe for the 2021 model year. The facelifted Santa Fe was stated to be built on a newer N3 platform, allowing hybrid and plug-in hybrid models to be offered. With the new platform, Hyundai claimed an expanded use of high-tensile steels in its body structure, while undercovers for the subframe, engine compartment, and cabin floors results in an improvement of the coefficient of drag from 0.34 to 0.33.

The updated Santa Fe features "T-shaped" LED lights that merge into a newer and wider "cascading grille". The rear has also been revised, with a long reflective strip running across the width of the car. Wider wheel arches have been engineered to accommodate the larger 20-inch wheels.

The vehicle has a redesigned centre stack with a shift-by-wire, push-button gear selector as well as a new drive mode selector. It also has a 10.25-inch touchscreen and the driver has a 12.3-inch digital gauge cluster.

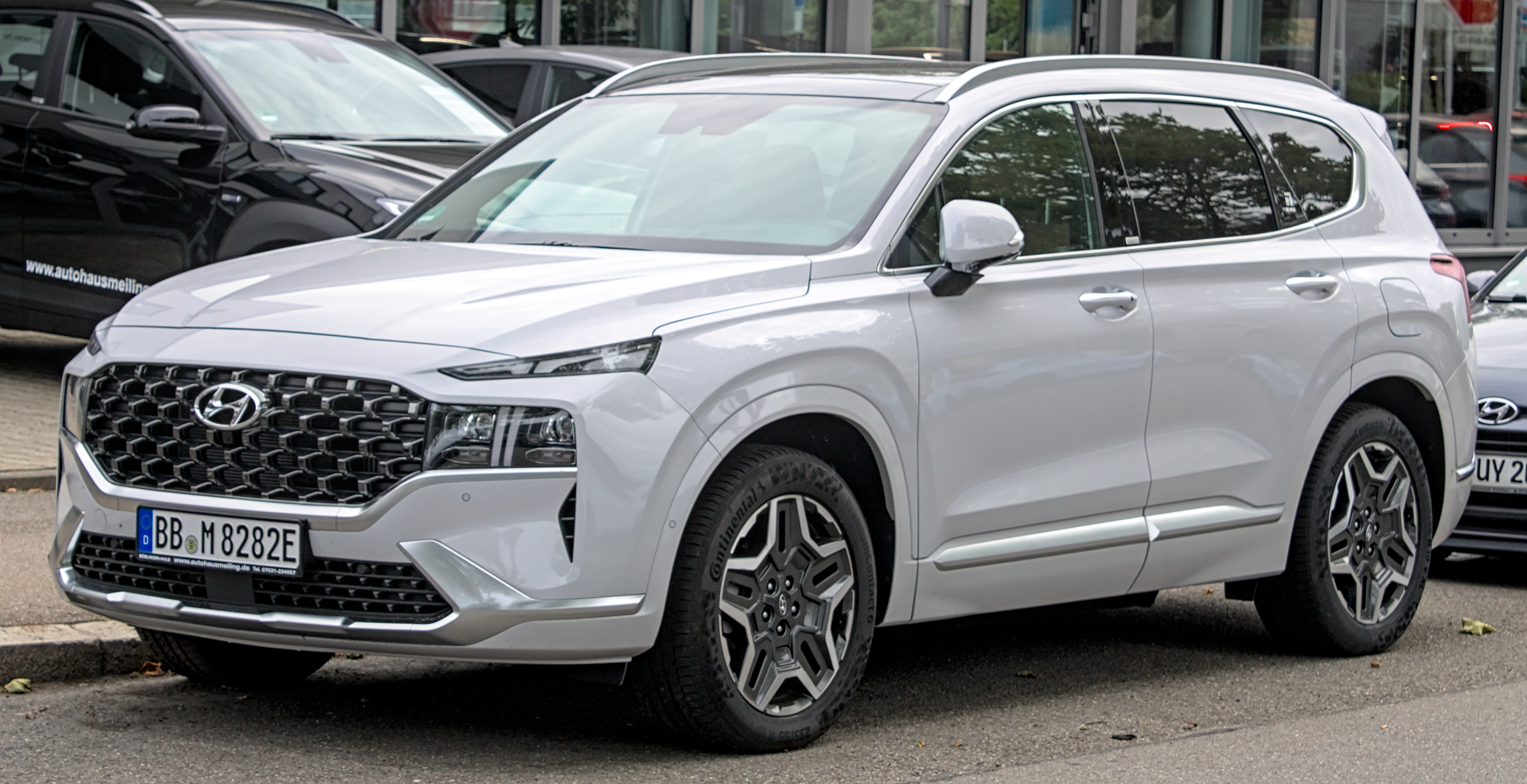
2021 Hyundai Santa Fe PHEV (facelift)

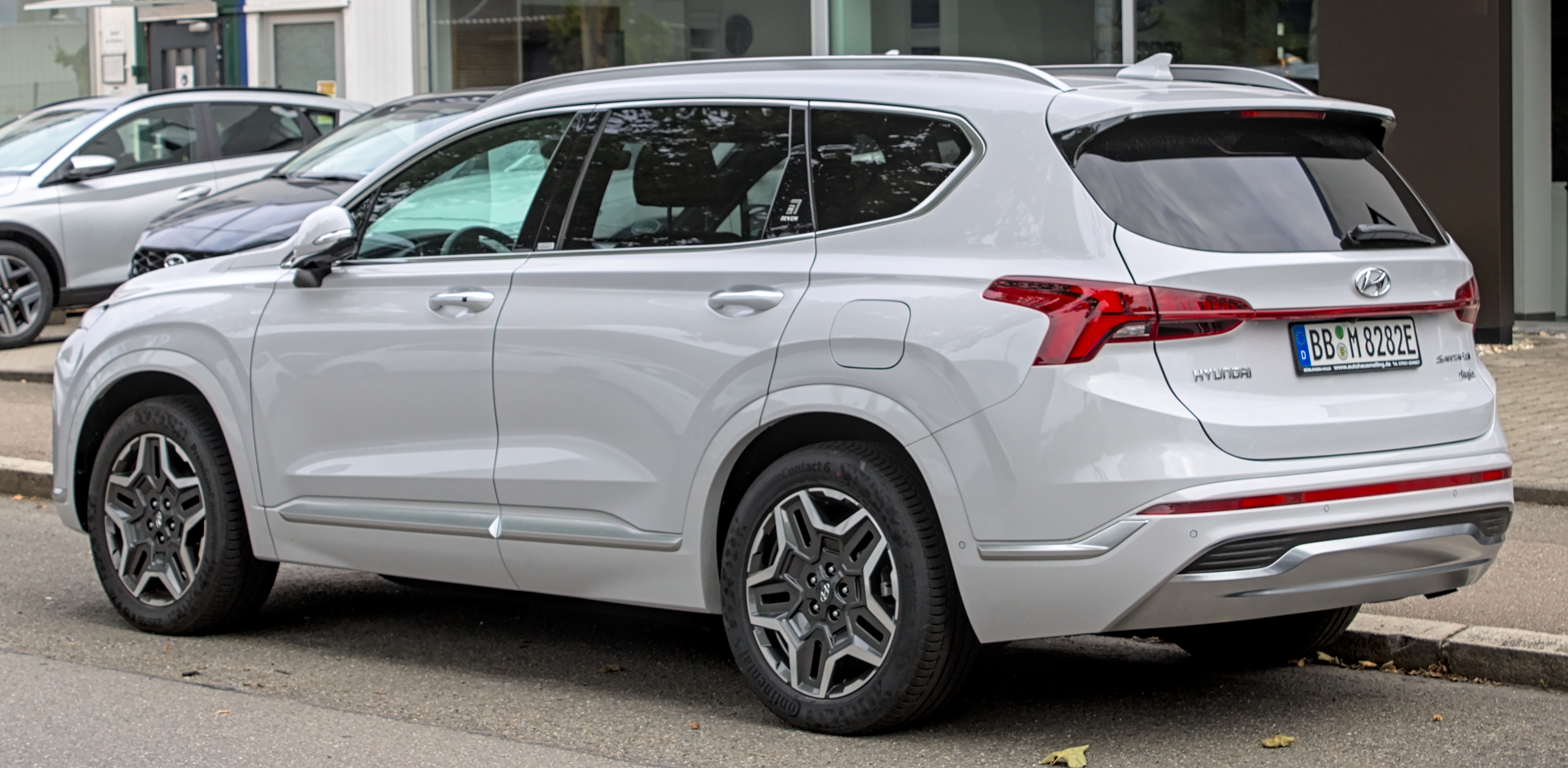
Rear view

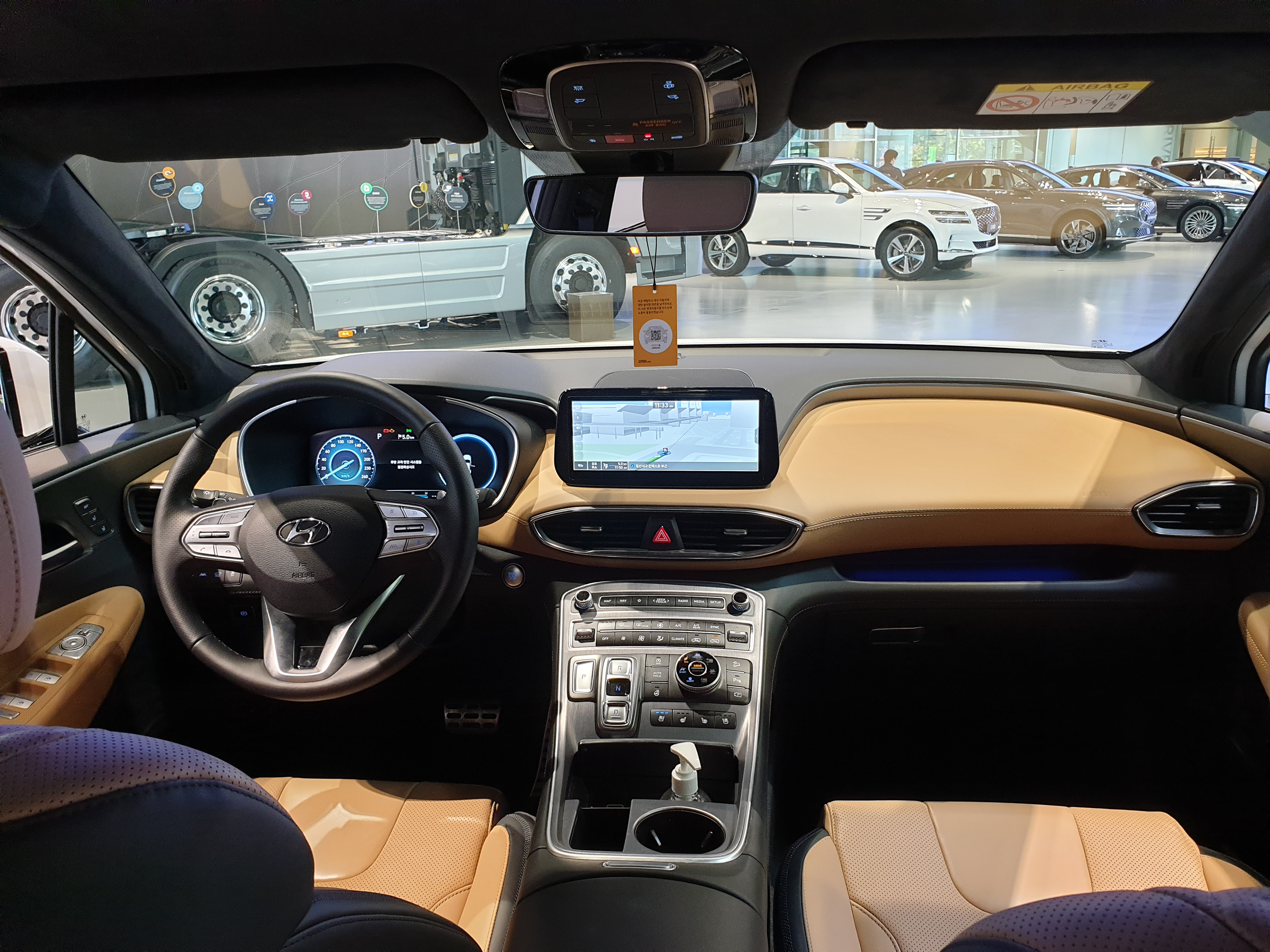
Interior

=== Markets ===
==== Australia ====
The fourth-generation Santa Fe was launched in Australia in June 2018. Initial trim levels included the Active, Elite and Highlander with a choice of two engines – a 2.4-litre four-cylinder petrol and 2.2-litre four-cylinder turbodiesel, while the V6 engine option from the previous generation was dropped. The V6 engine option was reintroduced with the 3.5-litre MPi petrol in 2020. The facelifted model was released in December 2020, with base, Active, Elite and Highlander trim levels, while the 2.2-litre diesel engine was updated.

==== China ====
The Chinese market fourth-generation Santa Fe was introduced in 2019 (called "Shengda" (胜达) in Chinese), featuring a restyled rear end similar to the eighth-generation Sonata. The Chinese version is 160 mm (6.3 in) longer than the international version, and featuring a 100 mm (3.9 in) longer wheelbase.

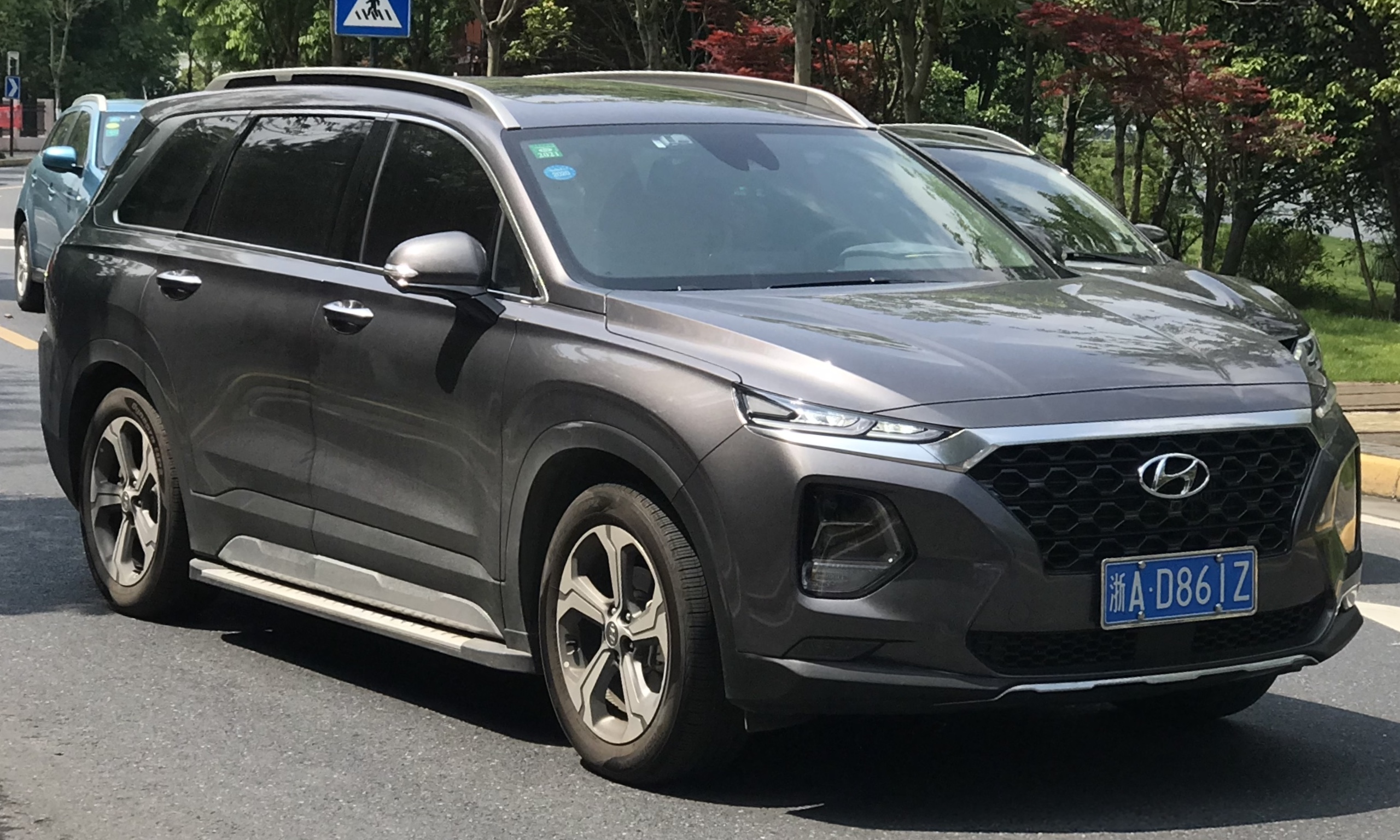
Hyundai Santa Fe (LWB, China)

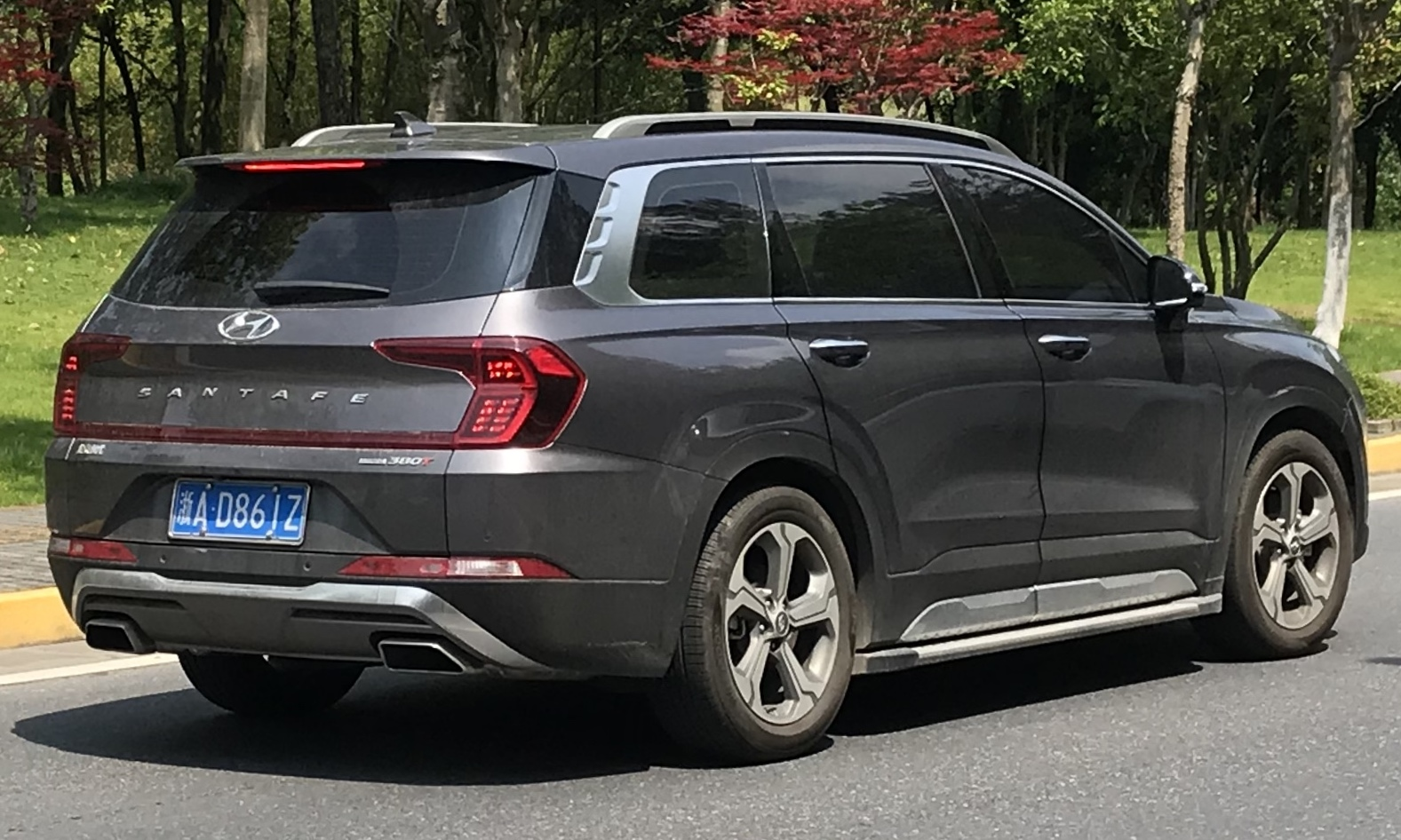
Hyundai Santa Fe (LWB, China)

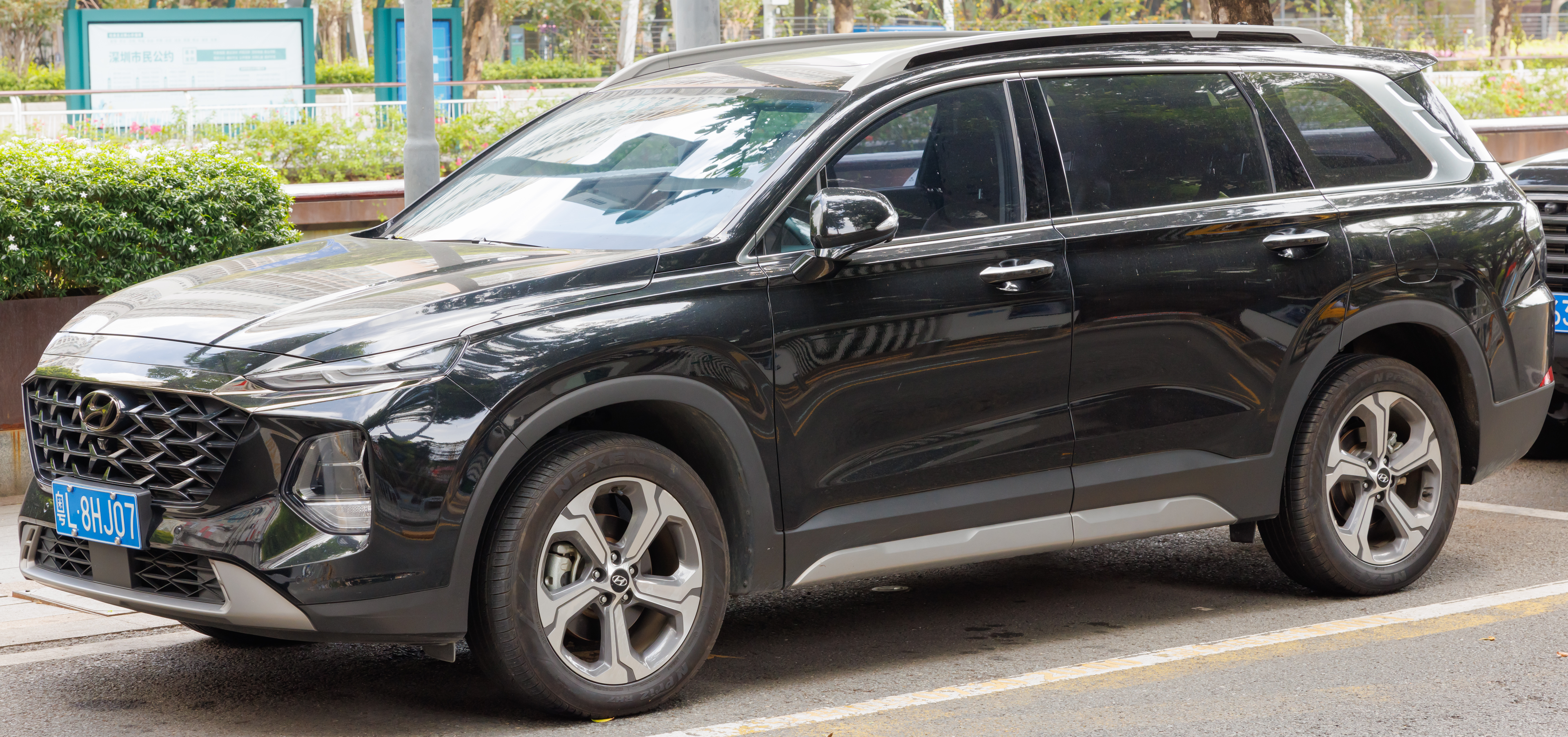
Hyundai Santa Fe Facelift (LWB, China)

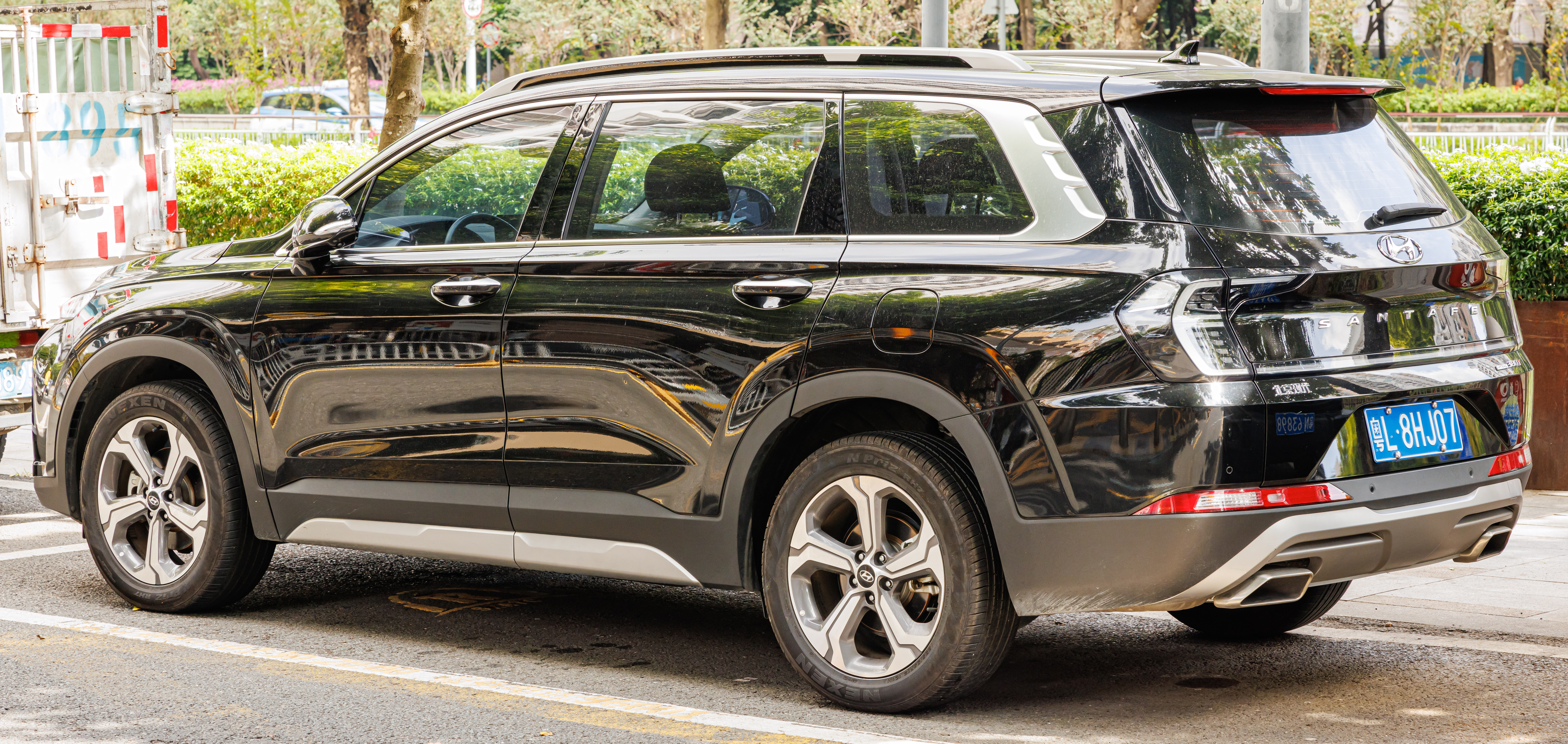
Hyundai Santa Fe Facelift (LWB, China)

==== Europe ====
In Europe, three engines were offered: a 2.0-litre diesel, 152 hp (154 PS; 113 kW) or 180 hp (182 PS; 134 kW), a 2.2-litre diesel (197 hp (200 PS; 147 kW)) and a 2.4-litre petrol engine (185 hp (188 PS; 138 kW)). The engines are offered with 6- or 8-speed automatic transmissions.

==== Malaysia ====
The fourth-generation Santa Fe was launched in Malaysia as an imported model in May 2019. Initial trim levels included the Executive and Premium with a choice of two engines – a 2.4-litre four-cylinder petrol and 2.2-litre four-cylinder turbodiesel. The locally assembled of the facelifted Santa Fe was launched on 6 September 2024, with three variants: Hybrid Plus, Hybrid Max and Diesel Max. Both hybrid variants come with the 1.6 L Smartstream G 1.6 T-GDi hybrid powertrain, while the Diesel Max comes with the Smartstream D 2.2 CRDi diesel engine.

==== North America ====
The fourth-generation Santa Fe was announced for the North American market at the 2018 New York International Auto Show and arrived in North American dealerships starting in mid-2018 as a 2019 model. The fourth-generation model replaced the two-row Santa Fe which was previously marketed as the Santa Fe Sport. The long-wheelbase, three-row, seven-passenger version previously marketed simply as the "Santa Fe" remained on sale for the 2019 model year as the Santa Fe XL. Its replacement, the Palisade, debuted in 2018 as a 2020 model.

Initial trim levels included the SE, SEL, SEL Plus, Limited and Ultimate. Engine choices in the region include a base 2.4-litre naturally aspirated GDi petrol engine with 185 hp (188 PS; 138 kW), and a more powerful 2.0-litre turbocharged petrol generating 235 hp (238 PS; 175 kW). A 2.2-litre diesel version of the Santa Fe with three-row seating was intended to be sold the United States for the 2019 model year, but was cancelled before launch.

The refreshed model was released in October 2020 for the 2021 model year. The new entry-level motor is a 2.5-litre Smartstream petrol engine, replacing the 2.4-litre engine, and producing 191 hp (194 PS; 142 kW). The 2.0-litre turbocharged petrol engine was replaced by the 2.5-litre Smartstream turbocharged petrol engine which generates 277 hp (281 PS; 207 kW). Hybrid and plug-in hybrid engines are also offered for the first time, which uses 1.6-litre turbocharged petrol engine paired with an electric motor and lithium-ion polymer battery. The enhanced blind-spot safety tech became standard on the Limited trim, and the Ultimate trim was removed and replaced by the new "Calligraphy" trim, similar to the Palisade.

==== Pakistan ====
Initially, the Santa Fe was launched in Pakistan as an imported model in February 2019 and was offered in only a single trim level. However, the local assembly of the fourth-generation facelifted Santa Fe commenced in Pakistan in October 2023. The vehicle comes in two hybrid variants: Smart (FWD) and Signature (AWD). Both variants come with the 1.6 L Smartstream G 1.6 T-GDi I4 hybrid powertrain.

==== Philippines ====
The facelifted Santa Fe was launched in the Philippines on 20 June 2022 and went on sale in dealerships on 17 August 2022. It is only offered in one trim which is the GLS, it is paired with Smartstream D 2.2-litre diesel engine matted to a 8-speed DCT.

==== South Korea ====
The South Korean market Santa Fe was available with a 2.0-litre turbocharged petrol engine producing 235–238 PS (173–175 kW; 232–235 hp), and two diesel engines which are 2.0-litre and 2.2-litre respectively. In December 2021, the model gained an optional 6-seat model with captain seats for the second row.

==== Thailand ====
The fourth-generation Santa Fe was launched in Thailand on 29 November 2023 at Thailand International Motor Expo 2023. Imported from Malaysia, trim levels offered is Exclusive with the 1.6 L Smartstream G 1.6 T-GDi hybrid powertrain.

==== Vietnam ====
The facelifted Santa Fe was introduced in Vietnam on 17 May 2021. It is offered in three trim levels: the entry-level Standard, the mid-trim Special and the top-spec Premium. It uses the Smartstream G 2.5-litre petrol engine paired with 6-speed automatic, and the Smartstream D 2.2-litre diesel engine paired with 8-speed Dual-clutch transmission.

=== Powertrain ===
Specs
Model	Year	Transmission	Power	Torque	0–100 km/h (official)	Top speed
Petrol
Theta II 2.0 T-GDI	2018–2020	8-speed automatic	235–238 PS (173–175 kW; 232–235 hp) @ 6,000 rpm	36.0 kg⋅m (353 N⋅m; 260 lbf⋅ft) @ 1,450–3,500 rpm		207 km/h (129 mph)
Smartstream G2.0 T-GDI	2020–2024	8-speed automatic	230 PS (169 kW; 227 hp) @ 6,000 rpm	36.0 kg⋅m (353 N⋅m; 260 lbf⋅ft) @ 1,450–3,500 rpm		198–199 km/h (123–124 mph)
Theta II 2.4 MPi	2018–2020	6-speed manual	172 PS (127 kW; 170 hp) @ 6,000 rpm	22.9 kg⋅m (225 N⋅m; 166 lbf⋅ft) @ 4,000 rpm	10.4s (FWD); 10.7s (AWD)	190 km/h (118 mph)
Theta II 2.4 MPi	2018–2020	6-speed automatic	172 PS (127 kW; 170 hp) @ 6,000 rpm	22.9 kg⋅m (225 N⋅m; 166 lbf⋅ft) @ 4,000 rpm	10.9s (FWD); 11.5s (AWD)	190 km/h (118 mph)
Theta II 2.4 GDi	2018–2020	6-speed automatic 8-speed automatic	188 PS (138 kW; 185 hp) @ 6,000 rpm	24.6 kg⋅m (241 N⋅m; 178 lbf⋅ft) @ 4,000 rpm	10.3s (FWD); 10.4s (AWD)	195 km/h (121 mph)
Smartstream G2.5 MPi	2020–2023	6-speed automatic	180 PS (132 kW; 178 hp) @ 6,000 rpm	23.7 kg⋅m (232 N⋅m; 171 lbf⋅ft) @ 4,000 rpm	10.1s (FWD); 10.3s (AWD)	195 km/h (121 mph)
Smartstream G2.5 GDi	2020–2023	8-speed automatic	194 PS (143 kW; 191 hp) @ 6,200 rpm	25 kg⋅m (245 N⋅m; 181 lbf⋅ft) @ 4,000 rpm		
Smartstream G2.5 T-GDI	2020–2023	8-speed DCT	281 PS (207 kW; 277 hp) @ 5,800 rpm	43 kg⋅m (422 N⋅m; 311 lbf⋅ft) @ 1,700–4,000 rpm		
Lambda II 3.5 MPI	2018–2020	8-speed automatic	280 PS (206 kW; 276 hp) @ 6,300 rpm	34.3 kg⋅m (336 N⋅m; 248 lbf⋅ft) @ 5,000 rpm	7.8s	210 km/h (130 mph)
Smartstream G3.5 MPI	2020–2023	8-speed automatic	272 PS (200 kW; 268 hp) @ 6,400 rpm	33.8 kg⋅m (331 N⋅m; 244 lbf⋅ft) @ 5,000 rpm	7.8s (FWD); 8.0s (AWD)	210 km/h (130 mph)
Hybrid
Smartstream G1.6 T-GDi Hybrid	2020–present	6-speed automatic	180 PS (132 kW; 178 hp) @ 5,500 rpm (engine); 60 PS (44 kW; 59 hp) @ 1,600–2,000 rpm (motor); 230 PS (169 kW; 227 hp) @ 5,500 rpm (combined)	27 kg⋅m (265 N⋅m; 195 lbf⋅ft) @ 1,500–4,400 rpm (engine); 26.9 kg⋅m (264 N⋅m; 195 lbf⋅ft) @ 0–1,600 rpm (motor); 35.7 kg⋅m (350 N⋅m; 258 lbf⋅ft) @ 1,500–4,400 rpm (combined)	8.9s (FWD); 9.1s (AWD)	187 km/h (116 mph)
Smartstream G1.6 T-GDi Plug-in Hybrid	2020–2023	6-speed automatic	180 PS (132 kW; 178 hp) @ 5,500 rpm (engine); 91 PS (67 kW; 90 hp) @ 2,100–3,300 rpm (motor); 265 PS (195 kW; 261 hp) (combined)	27 kg⋅m (265 N⋅m; 195 lbf⋅ft) @ 1,500–4,400 rpm (engine); 30.9 kg⋅m (303 N⋅m; 224 lbf⋅ft) @ 0–2,100 rpm (motor); 35.7 kg⋅m (350 N⋅m; 258 lbf⋅ft) @ 1,500–4,400 rpm (combined)	8.8s (AWD)	187 km/h (116 mph)
Diesel
R II 2.0 CRDi	2018–2020	6-speed manual 8-speed automatic	185–186 PS (136–137 kW; 182–183 hp) @ 4,000 rpm	40.8–41 kg⋅m (400–402 N⋅m; 295–297 lbf⋅ft) @ 1,750–2,750 rpm		
R II 2.2 CRDi	2018–2020	6-speed manual	193–202 PS (142–149 kW; 190–199 hp) @ 3,800 rpm	45.0 kg⋅m (441 N⋅m; 325 lbf⋅ft) @ 1,750–2,750 rpm	9.4s (FWD); 9.5s (AWD)	198 km/h (123 mph)
R II 2.2 CRDi	2018–2020	8-speed automatic	193–202 PS (142–149 kW; 190–199 hp) @ 3,800 rpm	45.0 kg⋅m (441 N⋅m; 325 lbf⋅ft) @ 1,750–2,750 rpm	9.3s (FWD); 9.4s (AWD)	203 km/h (126 mph)
Smartstream D2.2 CRDi	2020–2023	8-speed DCT	202 PS (149 kW; 199 hp) @ 3,800 rpm	45.0 kg⋅m (441 N⋅m; 325 lbf⋅ft) @ 1,750–2,750 rpm	9.0s (FWD); 9.2s (AWD)	205 km/h (127 mph)

=== Safety ===
==== ANCAP ====
ANCAP test results* Hyundai Santa Fe all petrol & diesel variants (excluding hybrid) (2018, aligned with Euro NCAP)
Test	Points	%
Overall:	5 /5 stars	
Adult occupant:	35.8	94%
Child occupant:	42.1	86%
Pedestrian:	32.1	67%
Safety assist:	10.1	78%

==== Euro NCAP ====
Euro NCAP test results* Hyundai Santa Fe 2.2CRDi (LHD) (2018)
Test	Points	%
Overall:	5 /5 stars	
Adult occupant:	35.9	94%
Child occupant:	43.2	88%
Pedestrian:	32.2	67%
Safety assist:	9.9	76%

==== IIHS ====
IIHS scores (2019 model year)
Small overlap front (driver)	Good	
Small overlap front (passenger)	Good	
Moderate overlap front (original test)	Good	
Side (original test)	Good	
Roof strength	Good	
Head restraints and seats	Good	
Headlights	Good	Marginal
Front crash prevention: vehicle-to-vehicle	Superior	
Front crash prevention: vehicle-to-pedestrian (Day)	Superior	
Child seat anchors (LATCH) ease of use	Acceptable	

== Fifth generation (MX5; 2023) ==
Fifth generation
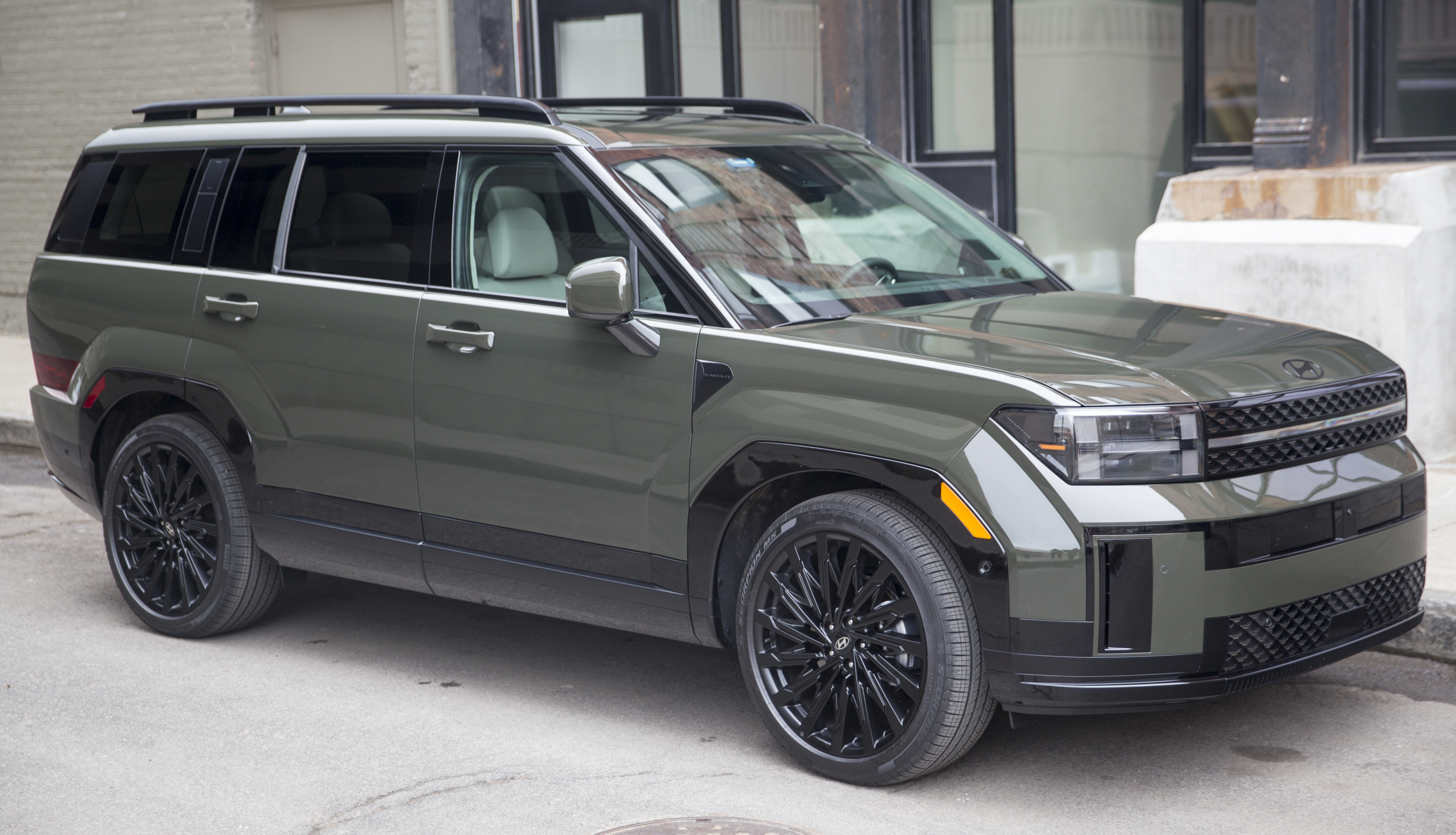
- 2024 Hyundai Santa Fe Calligraphy (US)

Overview
- Model code: MX5
- Production: 2023–present
- Model years: 2024–present
- Assembly: South Korea: Ulsan (Ulsan Plant 2); United States: Montgomery, Alabama (HMMA); China: Beijing (Beijing Hyundai); Vietnam: Ninh Bình (HTMV) Indonesia: Cikarang (HMMI); Kazakhstan: Almaty
- Designer: SangYup Lee

Body and chassis
- Platform: Hyundai-Kia N3/N4
- Related: Hyundai Santa Cruz; Hyundai Mufasa; Hyundai Tucson (NX4); Kia Sorento (MQ4); Kia Sportage (NQ5)

Powertrain
- Engine: Petrol: 2.0 L Smartstream G2.0 T-GDi I4; 2.5 L Smartstream G2.5 GDi I4; 2.5 L Smartstream G2.5 T-GDi I4; Petrol hybrid: 1.6 L Smartstream G1.6 T-GDi I4; Petrol plug-in hybrid: 1.6 L Smartstream G1.6 T-GDi I4
- Electric motor: Permanent magnet synchronous (hybrid models): 44.2 kW (60 PS; 59 hp) (HEV); 66.9 kW (91 PS; 90 hp) (PHEV)
- Transmission: 6-speed A6MF2H automatic; 8-speed automatic; 8-speed D8LF1 dual-clutch automatic
- Hybrid drivetrain: Parallel hybrid; PHEV
- Battery: 1.49 kWh lithium-ion polymer (hybrid); 13.8 kWh lithium-ion polymer (PHEV)

Dimensions
- Wheelbase: 2,815 mm (110.8 in)
- Length: 4,830 mm (190.2 in)
- Width: 1,900 mm (74.8 in)
- Height: 1,720–1,795 mm (67.7–70.7 in)
- Kerb weight: 1,845–2,295 kg (4,068–5,060 lb)

The fifth-generation Santa Fe was announced by Hyundai on 17 July 2023, followed by a full unveiling on 10 August 2023.

Developed under the codename MX5, Hyundai designed the vehicle to appeal to the growing outdoor lifestyle globally by adopting a boxy design. Hyundai stated that the fifth-generation Santa Fe achieved a drag coefficient of 0.29, compared with 0.33 for the previous generation, through aerodynamic design improvements. The model is 55 mm (2.2 in) longer than the outgoing model, with the same width. The 2,815 mm (110.8 in) wheelbase is 50 mm (2.0 in) longer than the previous generation.

The headlamps and tail lamps take on an H-shaped design, with a light bar spanning the width of the front end in the centre of the grille. The tail lamps are positioned at the bottom of the liftgate directly above the rear bumper. It also sports angular wheel arches on the fenders.

The Santa Fe will also become Hyundai's first extended-range electric vehicle. Reports from ETNews suggests the EREV version of the Santa Fe will start production in 2026 and start sales in 2027. A prototype version was spotted on 24 November 2025 and is based on the North American version (codenamed MX5a), likely meaning the EREV version will be produced in Montgomery, Alabama, United States.

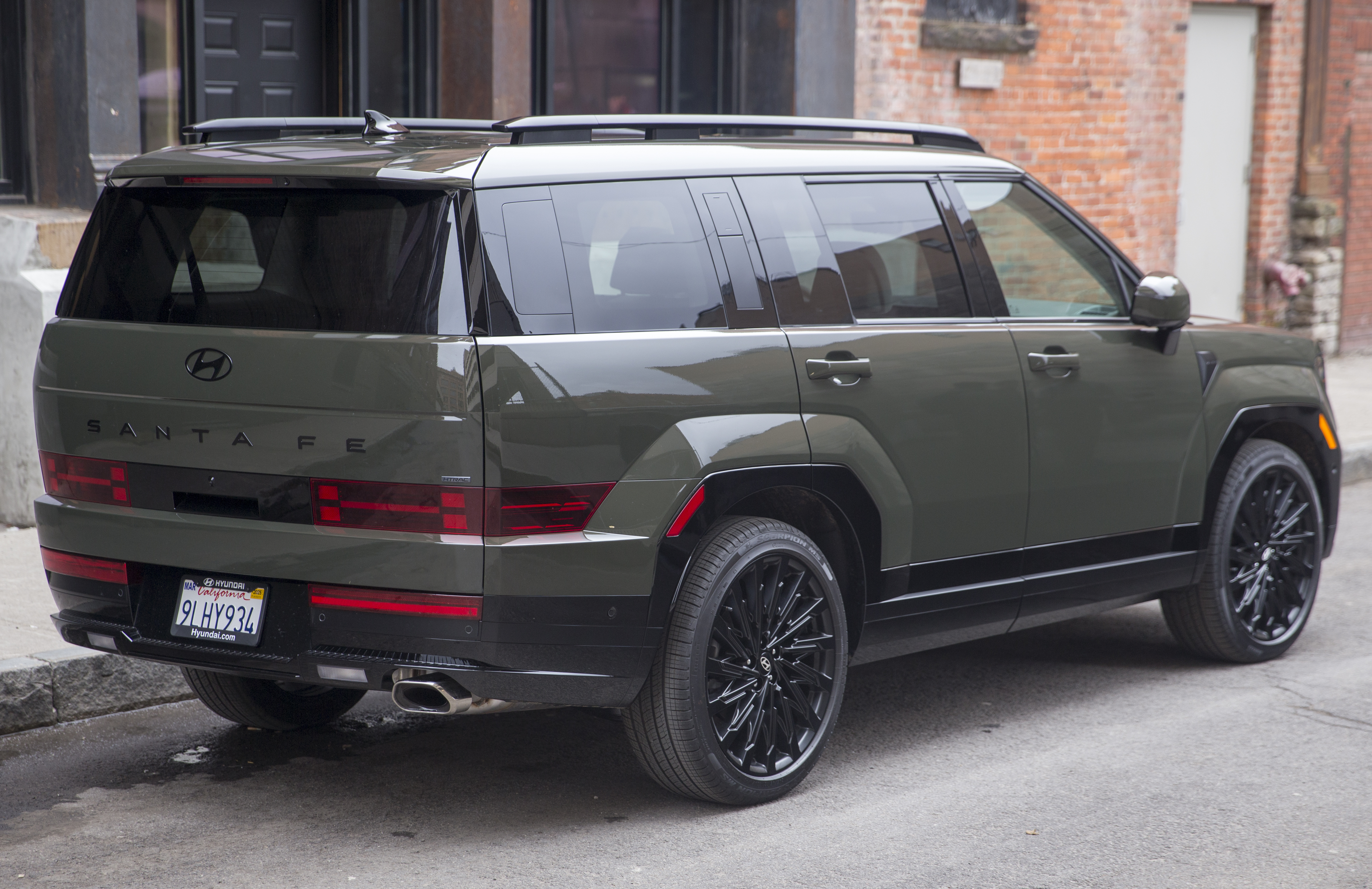
Rear view

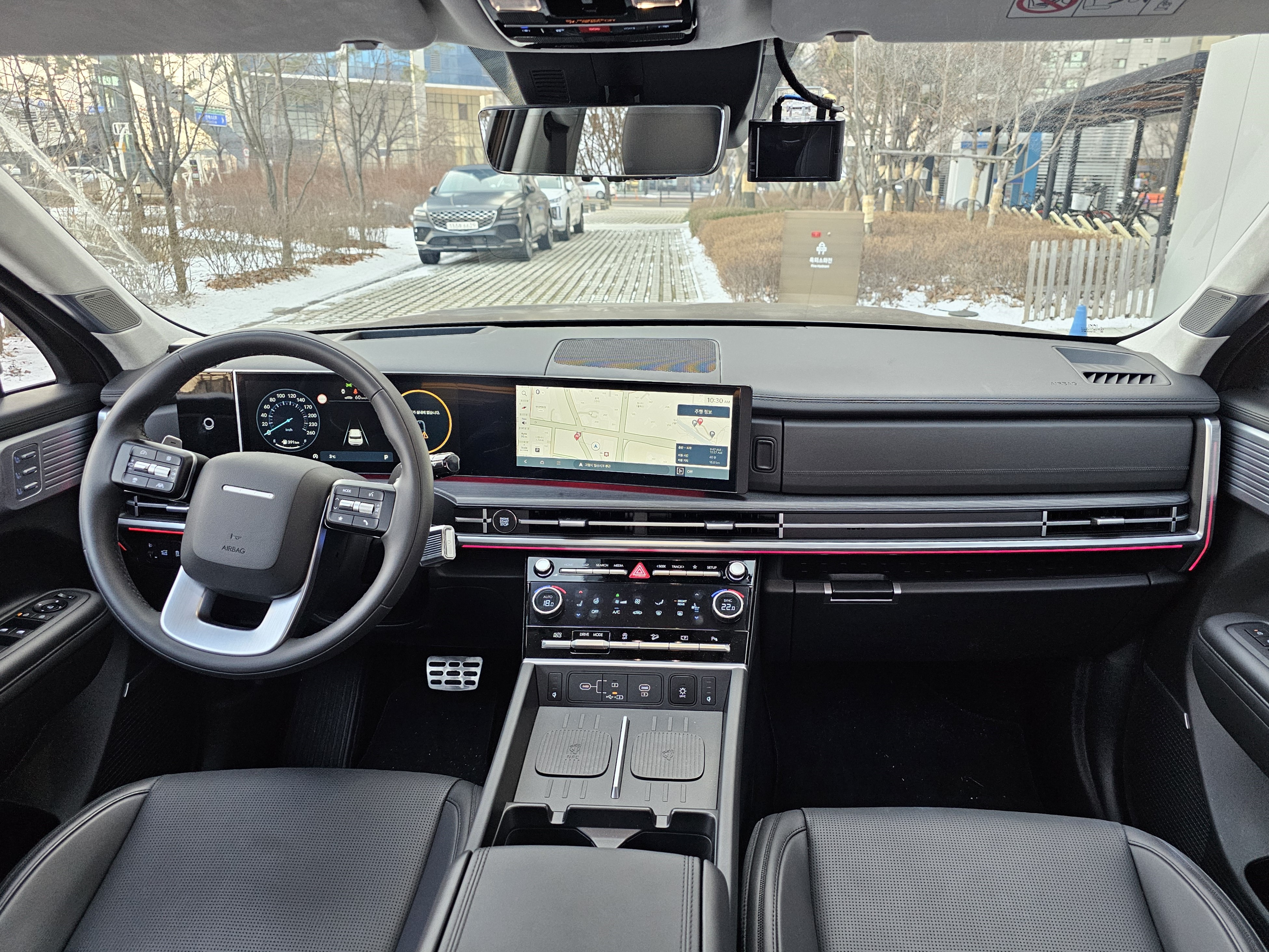
Interior

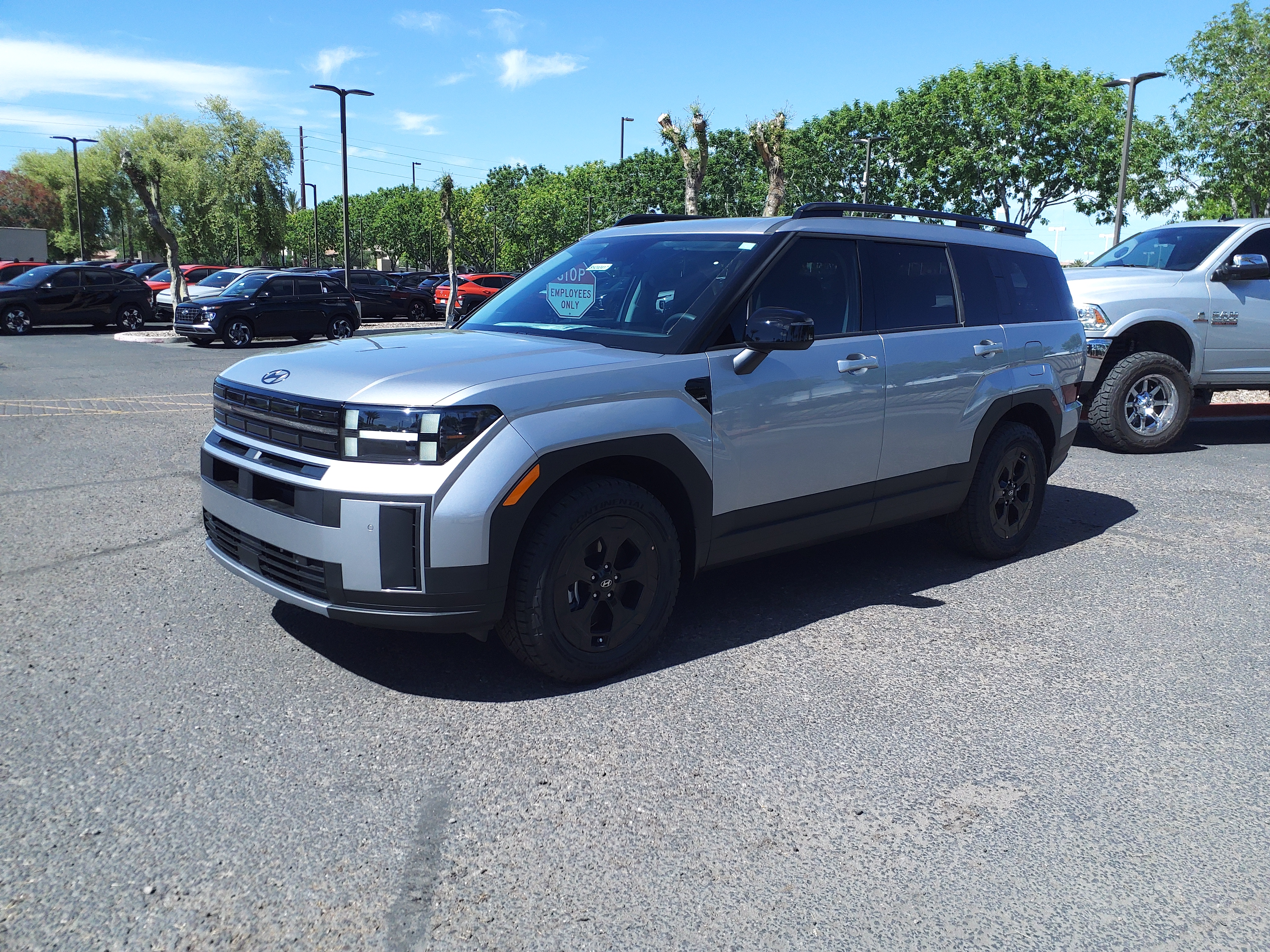
Santa Fe XRT

Ensuring spacious interior space and large cargo volume, Hyundai chose to design the SUV starting from the rear. A higher roofline increased headroom space for second row occupants. Second-row legroom is rated 1,075 mm (42.3 in) for petrol variants (+35 mm (1.4 in) over the older Santa Fe) and 1,055 mm (41.5 in) for the hybrid. Third-row legroom is rated 761 mm (30.0 in) (+15 mm (0.6 in)), while headroom is 958 mm (37.7 in) (+69 mm (2.7 in)) and seat height is 282 mm (11.1 in) (+30 mm (1.2 in)). The third-row seats also recline by 10 degrees. Hyundai also claims a 725-litre cargo capacity for the SUV.

The tailgate was also specifically designed to allow a large opening by repositioning the struts. As a consequence, the taillights had to be relocated downwards. "When you have a tail lamp like a conventional car, you have a tail lamp up [higher]) and the strut has to move inboard [on the tailgate]. This really reduces the width of the tailgate quite significantly. Therefore we deliberately bring the taillight under the strut," according to SangYup Lee, Hyundai's global head of design.

Hyundai relocated the shift lever to the steering column, which allows the centre console to host two wireless phone charging pads, and a pair of cupholders. A Panoramic Curved Display which combines the 12.3-inch digital instrument cluster and infotainment system into one curved screen is also a new addition.

The previous generation Santa Fe architecture and major suspension components is retained for this generation, although the cooling system, component friction and other parameters have been revised. Available powertrain options include a 2.5-litre petrol, 2.5-litre turbocharged petrol, 1.6-litre turbocharged hybrid and 1.6-litre turbocharged plug-in hybrid. Diesel engine options are not available for this generation, as well as the V6 petrol engine that was previously offered in markets such as Australia.

=== Markets ===
==== Europe ====
The fifth-generation Santa Fe made its European debut during the first half of 2024, it comes only available with hybrid electric powertrains with the option between front-wheel and all-wheel drive. The European model is offered with hybrid and plug-in hybrid powertrains and, unlike the North American version, does not feature the illuminated light bar across the front.

==== Latin America ====
===== Argentina =====
The fifth-generation Santa Fe was launched in Argentina on 1 September 2025, in the sole unnamed variant powered by the 2.5-litre T-GDi turbocharged petrol.

===== Mexico =====
The fifth-generation Santa Fe went on sale in Mexico on 1 June 2024, in two trim levels: GLS Premium and Limited Tech. It is available with either a 2.5-litre T-GDi turbocharged petrol or a 1.6-litre T-GDi Hybrid turbocharged petrol powertrains.

In 2026, the Santa Fe was updated for the 2026 model year in Mexico, it became Imported from Vietnam instead of South Korea.

==== Middle East ====
The GCC market fifth-generation Santa Fe was launched on 27 February 2024. It is equipped with three rows of seats, with two powertrain options, which are the 2.5-litre GDi engine and a 2.5-litre T-GDi turbocharged engine.

==== North America ====
The North American market fifth-generation Santa Fe was introduced on 10 August 2023 in Santa Fe, New Mexico, and went on sale in March 2024. The North American model is manufactured at Hyundai's Montgomery plant in Alabama and is equipped with three rows of seats. Two powertrains are offered: a 2.5-litre T-GDi turbocharged petrol and a 1.6-litre T-GDi Hybrid turbocharged petrol. For the 2026 model year, announced in July 2025, the 8-speed dual-clutch automatic used with the 2.5-litre T-GDi turbocharged petrol was replaced by a conventional 8-speed torque-converter automatic.

Trim levels
United States	Canada
SE	
SEL	Preferred
XRT
Limited	Luxury
Calligraphy	Ultimate Calligraphy

In addition, the 2.5-litre T-GDi turbocharged petrol engine was dropped from the Canadian lineup, effectively making the Canadian-market Santa Fe hybrid-only due to commitments to transition to only selling electrified vehicles in Canada. Another change made for the Canadian-market Santa Fe (in addition to becoming hybrid-only) is that it is now imported from South Korea instead of the United States due to Canada's counter-retaliatory tariffs on US-built vehicles.

==== Oceania ====
===== Australia =====
The fifth-generation Santa Fe was launched in Australia on 8 May 2024, with three trim levels: Santa Fe, Elite and Calligraphy. All three trim levels are powered by a 1.6-litre T-GDi Hybrid turbocharged petrol and all-wheel drive is standard on all trim levels (except for the entry level trim it is optional). The 2.5-litre T-GDi turbocharged petrol was made available for all three trim levels in December 2024.

===== New Zealand =====
The fifth-generation Santa Fe went on sale in New Zealand on 3 July 2024, in three trim levels: Active, Limited and Calligraphy; it is powered by a 1.6-litre T-GDi Hybrid turbocharged petrol.

==== South Africa ====
The fifth-generation Santa Fe was launched in South Africa in June 2025, in a sole Elite trim powered by a 1.6-litre T-GDi Hybrid turbocharged petrol. It was the first Hyundai model offered with a hybrid powertrain in the South African market.

==== Southeast Asia ====
===== Brunei =====
The fifth-generation Santa Fe was launched in Brunei on 6 September 2024, in three trim levels: Exclusive (7-seater), Prestige (6-seater) and Calligraphy (6-seater), all variants are powered by the 2.5-litre GDi petrol engine.

===== Indonesia =====
The fifth-generation Santa Fe went on sale in Indonesia on 24 October 2024. For Indonesia, the Santa Fe consist of two variants, namely Prime and Calligraphy, with both types have the powertrain option between the 2.5-litre GDi petrol and 1.6-litre T-GDi Hybrid turbocharged petrol. It is locally assembled at the Hyundai Motor Manufacturing Indonesia (HMMI) plant in Cikarang, Bekasi, West Java, with mass production began on 25 October 2024. The Santa Fe Hybrid marks the first time Hyundai is offering their hybrid lineup to the Indonesian market, while also becoming the company's first hybrid vehicle to be produced in the country.

In February 2026, the XRT variant powered by the 1.6-litre T-GDi Hybrid was introduced to the line-up.

===== Laos =====
The fifth-generation Santa Fe is offered in Laos with 2.5-litre GDi, 2.5-litre T-GDi, 1.6-litre T-GDi Hybrid and 1.6-litre T-GDi Plug-in Hybrid powertrains.

===== Malaysia =====
The fifth-generation Santa Fe was previewed in Malaysia in June 2025 and launched on 2 July 2025. In Malaysia, it was available with three variants: HEV Prime, HEV Prestige and 2.5 T-GDi HTRAC Calligraphy. For powertrains, the Prime and Prestige are powered by the 1.6-litre T-GDi Hybrid turbocharged petrol, while the Calligraphy is powered by the 2.5-litre T-GDi turbocharged petrol engine with standard all-wheel drive.

===== Philippines =====
The fifth-generation Santa Fe was launched in the Philippines on 8 March 2024, with two trim levels: GLS and Calligraphy. Two powertrain options are available: a 2.5-litre GDi petrol and a 2.5-litre T-GDi turbocharged petrol engine, and all-wheel drive is available (optional on GLS; standard on Calligraphy). The Hybrid version was added for the Calligraphy trim in July 2024. The entry-level GL trim powered by the 2.5-litre GDi petrol was added in July 2025.

===== Singapore =====
Komoco Motors launched the fifth-generation Santa Fe in Singapore on 19 June 2024, with two variants, powered by the 1.6-litre T-GDi Hybrid turbocharged petrol.

===== Taiwan =====
The fifth-generation Santa Fe was launched in Taiwan on 25 October 2024, with five variants: GLTH-A, GLTH-B, GLTH-B Premium, GLTH-C, and GLTH-C Premium. For powertrains, all variants are powered by the 1.6-litre T-GDi Hybrid turbocharged petrol and all-wheel drive comes standard on the GLTH-B Premium and GLTH-C Premium variants. In August 2025, the Calligraphy model based on the GLTH-C Premium variant was added to the line-up.

===== Thailand =====
The fifth-generation Santa Fe was launched in Thailand on 15 July 2025. Imported from Vietnam, two trim levels are available: Exclusive and Prestige, both trims are powered by the 1.6-litre T-GDi Hybrid turbocharged petrol. In March 2026, the Inspiration AWD trim was added to the line-up as the flagship trim.

===== Vietnam =====
The fifth-generation Santa Fe was launched in the Vietnamese market on 18 September 2024, with three trim levels: Exclusive, Prestige and Calligraphy. Two powertrain options are available: a 2.5-litre GDi petrol and a 2.5-litre T-GDi turbocharged petrol engine and all-wheel drive is available starting from the Prestige trim. The Calligraphy trim has the option between 6 and 7 seats. In December 2025, the Hybrid version was introduced in Vietnam as the flagship variant.

=== Powertrain ===
Specs
Model	Year	Transmission	Power	Torque	0–100 km/h (0–62 mph) (official)	Top speed
Petrol
Smartstream G2.0 T-GDi	2024–present	8-speed automatic	247 PS (182 kW; 244 hp) @ 6,000 rpm	36 kg⋅m (353 N⋅m; 260 lbf⋅ft) @ 1,500–4,500 rpm		210 km/h (130 mph)
Smartstream G2.5 GDi	2023–present	8-speed automatic	194 PS (143 kW; 191 hp) @ 6,200 rpm	25.1 kg⋅m (246 N⋅m; 182 lbf⋅ft) @ 4,000 rpm	11.5s	198 km/h (123 mph)
Smartstream G2.5 T-GDi	2023–present (selected markets); 2024–2025 model years (North America)	8-speed DCT	281 PS (207 kW; 277 hp) @ 5,800 rpm	43 kg⋅m (422 N⋅m; 311 lbf⋅ft) @ 1,700–4,000 rpm	8.0s	210 km/h (130 mph)
Smartstream G2.5 T-GDi	2026 model year–present (North America)	8-speed automatic	281 PS (207 kW; 277 hp) @ 5,800 rpm	43 kg⋅m (422 N⋅m; 311 lbf⋅ft) @ 1,700–4,000 rpm	8.0s	210 km/h (130 mph)
Hybrid
Smartstream G1.6 T-GDi Hybrid	2023–present	6-speed automatic	230 PS (169 kW; 227 hp) @ 5,500 rpm (combined)	35.7 kg⋅m (350 N⋅m; 258 lbf⋅ft) @ 1,500–4,400 rpm (combined)	9.5s	190 km/h (118 mph)
Smartstream G1.6 T-GDi Plug-in Hybrid	2023–present	6-speed automatic	265 PS (195 kW; 261 hp) (combined)	35.7 kg⋅m (350 N⋅m; 258 lbf⋅ft) @ 1,500–4,400 rpm (combined)	9.1s	190 km/h (118 mph)

=== Safety ===
==== ANCAP ====
ANCAP test results Hyundai Santa Fe all variants (2024, aligned with Euro NCAP)
Test	Points	%
Overall:	5 /5 stars	
Adult occupant:	33.97	84%
Child occupant:	42.34	86%
Pedestrian:	48.73	77%
Safety assist:	14.56	80%

==== Euro NCAP ====
Euro NCAP test results Hyundai Santa Fe HEV AWD (LHD) (2024)
Test	Points	%
Overall:	4 /5 stars	
Adult occupant:	34	84%
Child occupant:	43.2	88%
Pedestrian:	44.5	70%
Safety assist:	12.5	69%

==== IIHS ====
The fifth-generation Santa Fe was named a 2025 Top Safety Pick+ by the IIHS; the award applies only to 2025 and 2026 model-year vehicles built after November 2024.

IIHS scores (2025 model year)
Small overlap front	Good
Moderate overlap front (original test)	Good
Moderate overlap front (updated test)	Good
Side (updated test)	Good
Headlights	Acceptable
Front crash prevention: vehicle-to-vehicle 2.0	Superior
Front crash prevention: vehicle-to-pedestrian	Superior
Seatbelt reminders	Good
Child seat anchors (LATCH) ease of use	Acceptable

== Sales ==
Calendar year	U.S.	Canada	South Korea	Europe	China	Australia	Indonesia	Malaysia (Note: Figures based on registration (Malaysia))	
Calendar year	U.S.	Canada	South Korea	Europe	China	Australia	Indonesia	Hyundai Santa Fe	Inokom Santa Fe
2000	10,332		20,399	704			16		
2001	56,017		54,170	21,284			52	2	
2002	78,279		70,288	32,743			411	3	
2003	101,278		77,261	36,558			86	0	
2004	111,447		69,236	39,986			41	1	
2005	68,006		48,432	31,949			31	0	
2006	63,931		50,566	49,690			40	0	
2007	92,421		50,535	44,171			46	0	104
2008	70,994		43,291	19,875			53	0	424
2009	80,343		58,324	11,992			20	1	186
2010	76,680		37,759	13,742			10	0	225
2011	74,391		26,096	13,559			3		951
2012	71,016	23,394	63,382	11,086	7,000	4,786	269		797
2013	88,844	29,220	78,872	10,588	74,437		568		1,217
2014	107,906	32,474	77,689	13,390	71,424		438		1,725
2015	118,134	30,211	92,928	14,492	33,356		312		889
2016	131,257	32,263	68,399	15,937	22,438		0		332
2017	133,171	28,402	51,661	11,728	12,300		176		210
2018	117,038	24,040	42,679	8,591	4,942		293		63
2019	127,373	18,929	44,911	8,962	15,561	5,857	471		0
2020	100,757	15,721	57,578	7,189	10,974	4,615	144		
2021	112,071	15,946	41,600	9,991	8,120	5,048	735		
2022	119,589	11,028	28,705	8,434	3,522	4,595	1,030		
2023	131,574	12,765	51,343	10,821	2,815	6,033	883	0	
2024	119,010	11,334	77,161	7,039	1,625	5,392	1,028	28	
2025	142,404	11,794	57,889	11,253	2,262	6,264	1,664	239	

== See also ==
- List of Hyundai vehicles
