= Hyundai Delta engine =

Δ-engine^{Delta engine}

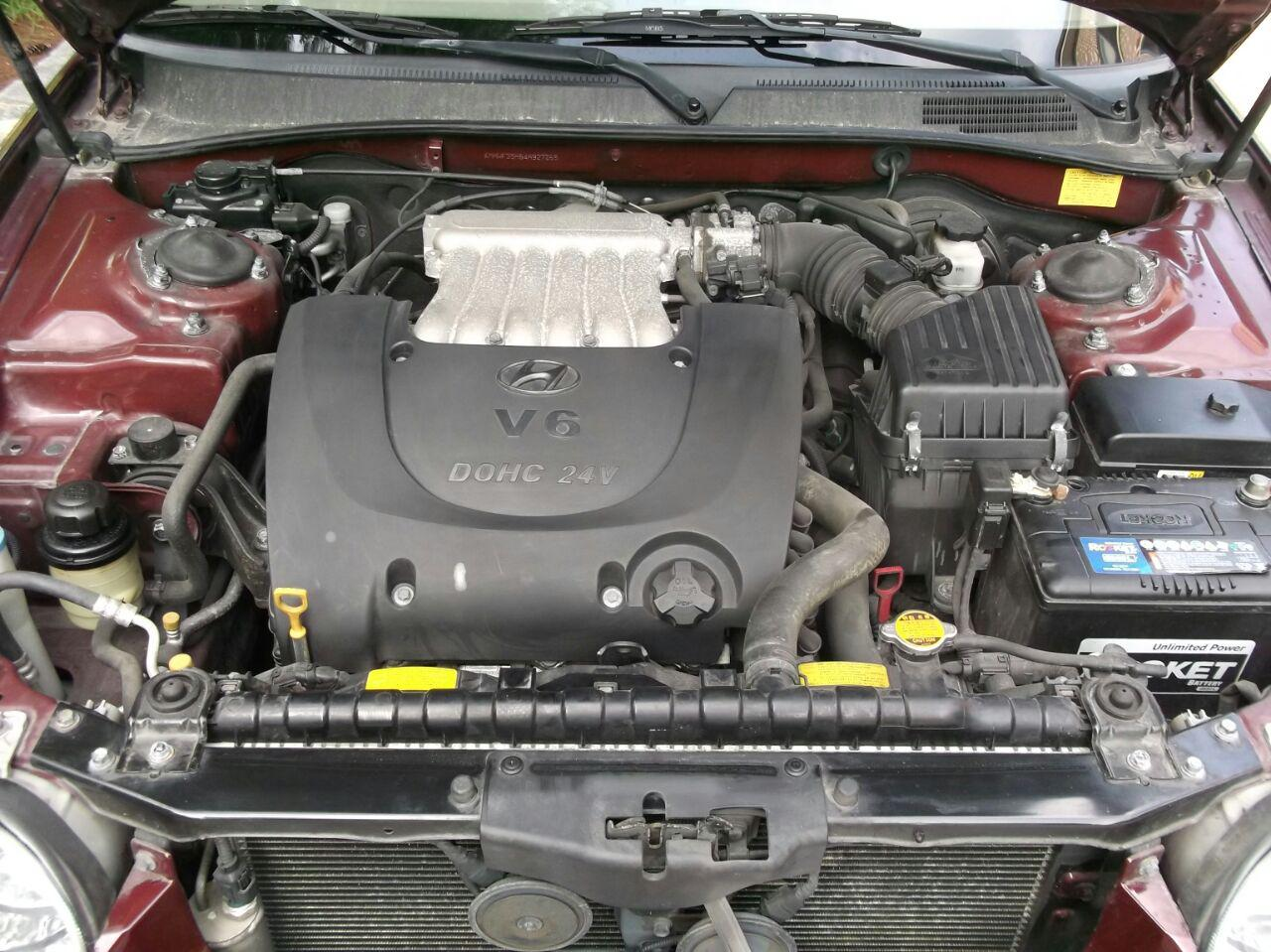

Overview
- Manufacturer: Hyundai Motor Company
- Production: 1998–2010

Layout
- Configuration: V6
- Displacement: 2.0 L; 121.9 cu in (1,998 cc); 2.5 L; 152.1 cu in (2,493 cc); 2.7 L; 162.1 cu in (2,656 cc)
- Cylinder bore: 84 mm (3.31 in); 86.7 mm (3.41 in)
- Piston stroke: 75 mm (2.95 in)
- Cylinder block material: Aluminum
- Cylinder head material: Aluminum
- Valvetrain: DOHC 4 valves x cyl.

RPM range
- Idle speed: 700±100

Combustion
- Fuel system: Multi-port fuel injection
- Fuel type: Gasoline; LPG
- Cooling system: Water-cooled

Output
- Power output: 134–185 PS (132–182 hp; 99–136 kW)
- Torque output: 18–25.8 kg⋅m (177–253 N⋅m; 130–187 lb⋅ft)

Chronology
- Successor: Mu

The Hyundai Delta family is the company's smaller V6 engine, ranging from 2.0 to 2.7 L (1,998 to 2,656 cc). sharing the same 75 mm (2.95 in) stroke and DOHC design.

== 2.0L (G6BP) ==
The G6BP (also called the 2.0 D) is the 2.0 L; 121.9 cu in (1,998 cc) version. Output is 134–148 PS (132–146 hp; 99–109 kW) at 6300 rpm and 18–18.7 kg⋅m (177–183 N⋅m; 130–135 lb⋅ft) at 4000 rpm.

Applications

- Hyundai Grandeur/XG (XG) (1998–2005)

== 2.5L (G6BV/G6BW) ==
The G6BW/G6BV (also called the 2.5 D) is the 2.5 L; 152.1 cu in (2,493 cc) version in a 90˚ configuration with an 84 mm (3.31 in) bore. Output is 172–180 PS (170–178 hp; 127–132 kW) at 6,000 rpm and 22.9–23.5 kg⋅m (225–230 N⋅m; 166–170 lb⋅ft) at 4,000 rpm. It made its first appearance in the 1999 EF series Sonata.

Applications

- Hyundai Grandeur/XG (XG) (1998–2005)
- Hyundai Sonata (EF) (1998–2001)
- Kia Optima (MS) (2000–2001)

== 2.7L (G6BA) ==
The G6BA/G6BAX/G6BAY (also called the 2.7 D) is the larger 2.7 L; 162.1 cu in (2,656 cc) version available in either 60˚ or 90˚ configuration with an 86.7 mm (3.41 in) bore. Output is 167–185 PS (165–182 hp; 123–136 kW) at 6,000 rpm and 25–25.8 kg⋅m (245–253 N⋅m; 181–187 lb⋅ft) of torque at 4,000 rpm. It has an aluminum engine block and aluminum DOHC cylinder heads. It uses Multi-port fuel injection, has 4 valves per cylinder, and features powder metal-forged, fracture-split connecting rods.

Applications

- Hyundai Grandeur/XG (XG) (1998–2005)
- Hyundai Santa Fe (SM) (2000–2005)
- Hyundai Sonata (EF) (2001–2004)
- Hyundai Tiburon/Coupe (GK) (2001–2008)
- Hyundai Trajet (1999–2008)
- Hyundai Tucson (JM) (2004–2009)
- Kia Opirus (2003–2006)
- Kia Optima (MS/MG) (2001–2006)
- Kia Sportage (KM) (2004–2010)

== 2.7L LPG (L6BA) ==
The L6BA (also called the 2.7 LPG) is the LPG version of the 2.7L petrol engine. Output is 144–160 PS (142–158 hp; 106–118 kW) at 5,000 rpm and 23–23.7 kg⋅m (226–232 N⋅m; 166–171 lb⋅ft) of torque at 4,000 rpm.

Applications

- Hyundai Santa Fe (SM) (2000–2005)
- Hyundai Trajet (1999–2007)

== Race engines ==
Oullim Motors have developed a turbocharged version of the 2.7 L Delta engine in Oullim Spirra that can produce up to 600 PS (592 hp; 441 kW) at 6,000 rpm.

Applications

- Oullim Spirra

== See also ==
- List of Hyundai engines
