= Hyundai Trajet =

Minivan class automobile produced by Hyundai

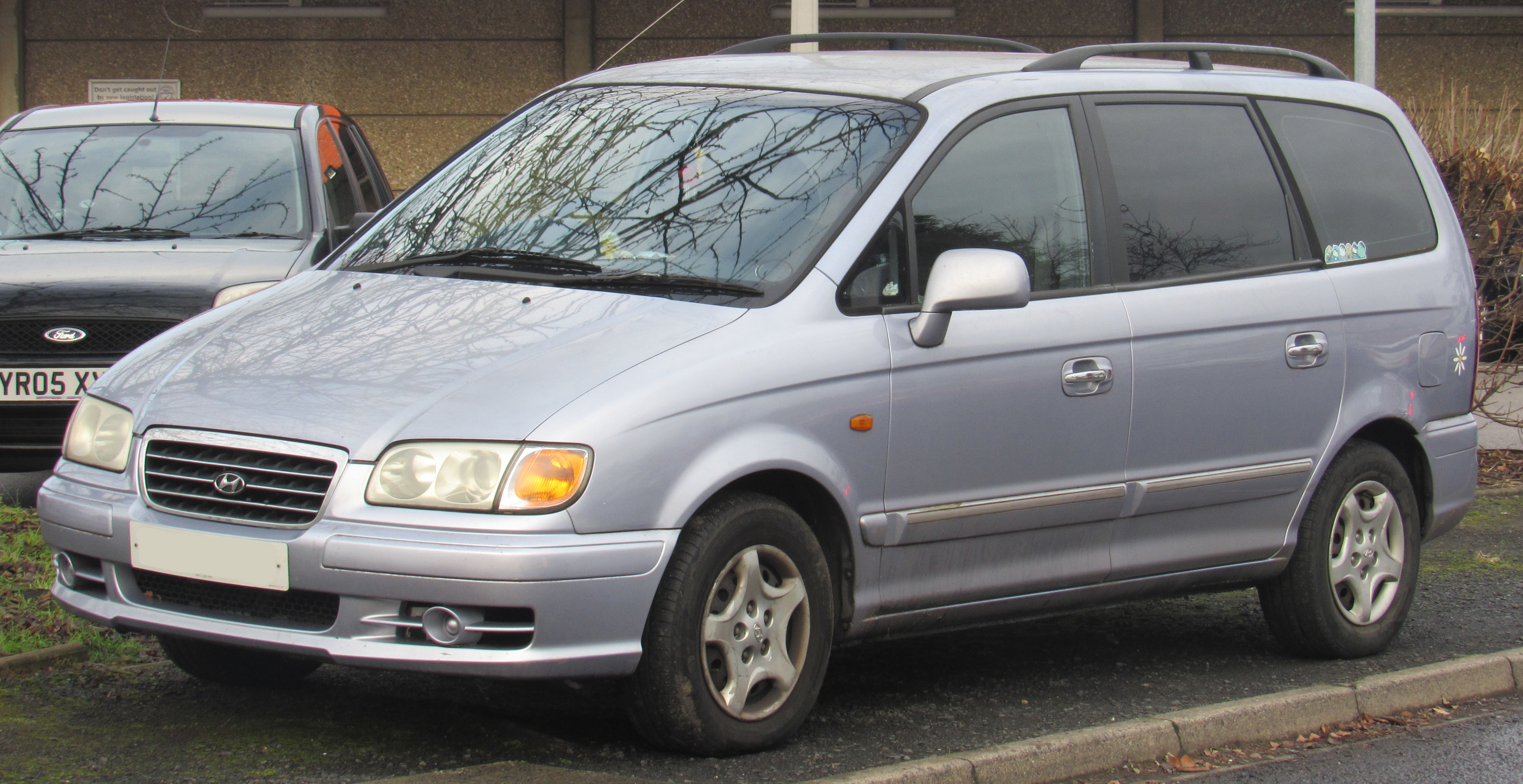
- Hyundai Trajet (pre-facelift)

Overview
- Manufacturer: Hyundai
- Model code: FO
- Also called: Hyundai Highway Van (Netherlands)
- Production: 1999–2008
- Assembly: South Korea: Ulsan; Indonesia: Bekasi (HIM)

Body and chassis
- Class: Large MPV
- Body style: 5 door minivan
- Layout: Front engine, front-wheel drive
- Platform: Hyundai–Kia Y4
- Related: Hyundai Grandeur (XG); Hyundai Sonata (EF); Hyundai Santa Fe (SM); Kia Optima/Magentis; Kia Carnival/Sedona

Powertrain
- Engine: Petrol: 2.0 L Sirius II I4; 2.0 L Beta II I4; 2.7 L Delta V6; Petrol/LPG: 2.7 L Delta LPi V6; Diesel: 2.0 L D4EA I4
- Transmission: 5 speed manual 4 speed automatic

Dimensions
- Wheelbase: 2,830 mm (111.4 in)
- Length: 4,695 mm (184.8 in)
- Width: 1,840 mm (72.4 in)
- Height: 1,760 mm (69.3 in)

Chronology
- Predecessor: Hyundai Santamo

The Hyundai Trajet (Hangul: 현대 트라제; pronounced as teuraje), is a seven-seater multi-purpose vehicle (MPV) that was manufactured by Hyundai Motor Company between 1999 and 2008. The series was officially launched in 1999, with choices of gasoline, diesel, or LPG fuel. In the United Kingdom, initially only the 2.0 GSI model was available; the limited-edition SE with a 2.7-litre V6 engine was added in 2001.

Sales began in South Korea in spring 1999 and the UK premiere was at the London Motorfair in October of that year. Vehicle sales in Europe began in spring 2000.

The name is derived from the French word "trajet" which means "journey", "path, walk, course, haul, itinerary" or to "travel from one point to another." In South Korea, it was marketed as the Hyundai Trajet XG to align it with the more luxurious Grandeur XG which uses the same platform.

== Overview ==
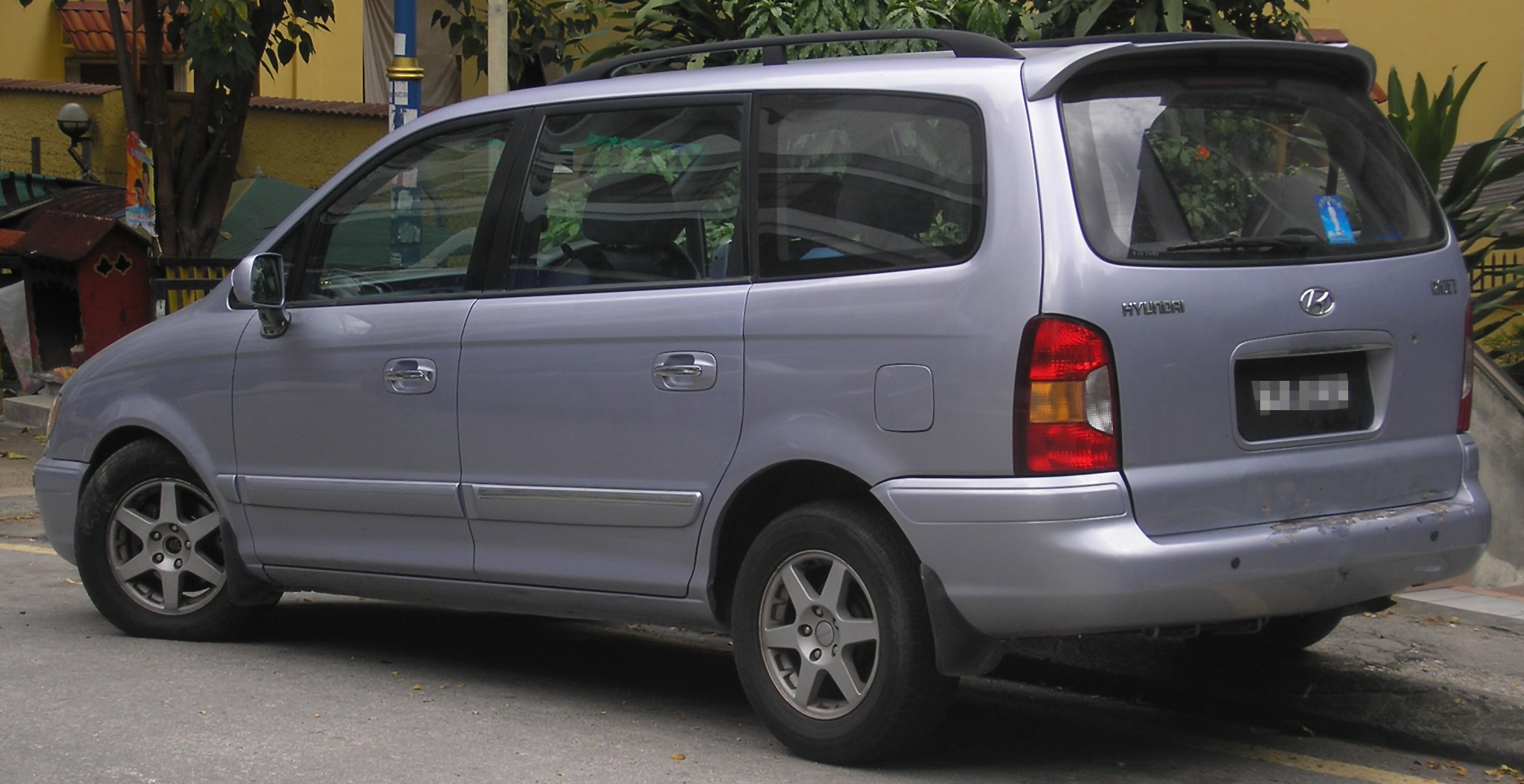
Rear view

=== 2000–2004 ===
Hyundai developed a seven-seat MPV targeting large families and the shuttle market segments. It is based on the platform shared with the Sonata and the first-generation Santa Fe. The Trajet was styled in Frankfurt, and made its public debut at the 1999 London Motor Show. The front end design was similar to some U.S. minivans and featuring a chromed grille flanked by horizontal headlamps and a sedan-like front bumper. The Trajet's tall greenhouse, front-hinged side doors, and a large liftgate "made it look like a large station wagon."

The Trajet features three rows of seats. The front seats can rotate 180 degrees to face the passengers in the back when the car is stationary, and the back seats can also be converted into tables, creating a virtual office space or a picnic area. The second- and third-row seats are double-folding and can also be completely removed. Because the Trajet is larger than many of its rivals, it offers comfort and space for seven adults, as well as cargo capacity with all the seats in place.

According to reviews, the Trajet does not do as well compared to the best European and Japanese MPVs because of "an overly firm around town" ride that "becomes bouncy at speed" with a "lot of body lean around corners." The light steering does not have enough feedback, and the engines are noisy under acceleration. Other reviewers, however, stated that the ride was comfortable but did not handle very well, with excessive body lean. The gearing on the 2.0-litre petrol four also came in for criticism for being to long, meaning that the car was significantly slower than the competition - the high gearing did, however, pay off at the fuel pump.

In European specifications, the 2.0-litre (1,997 cc) petrol Sirius II engine produces 139 PS (102 kW; 137 hp) at 5,800 rpm and 180 N⋅m (133 lb⋅ft) at 4,000 rpm, enough for a claimed 178 km/h (111 mph) top speed with the five-speed manual transmission.

=== 2004–2008 ===
The model range was updated in September 2004. The petrol-powered 2.0 GSI used the Beta II engine, which included CVVT (available earlier in the Coupé), and went from 133 to 139 bhp (99 to 104 kW; 135 to 141 PS), with lowered CO_{2} emissions from 223 g/km to 208 g/km.

Fuel consumption was improved — the combined figure (average consumption in town and highway driving) rose from 30.4 to 32.5 mpg_{‑US} (7.7 to 7.2 L/100 km; 36.5 to 39.0 mpg_{‑imp}). Trajets now included three point seat belts for all rear passengers.

Departing from most minivans that offered sliding doors, Hyundai retained the regular hinged rear passenger doors. Following the pattern of U.S. minivans, the automatic transmission gear selector was mounted on the steering column and the center console was eliminated. For specific markets and engines, a 5-speed manual with a floor-mounted shifter between the front seats was available.

Rather than developing a new vehicle, Hyundai adapted an existing line market needs even though consumer trends had already shifted. Just like the name of the model "itself, meant a route to follow, and the vehicle was adequate for that. Production and marketing ended in 2008 without a direct successor.

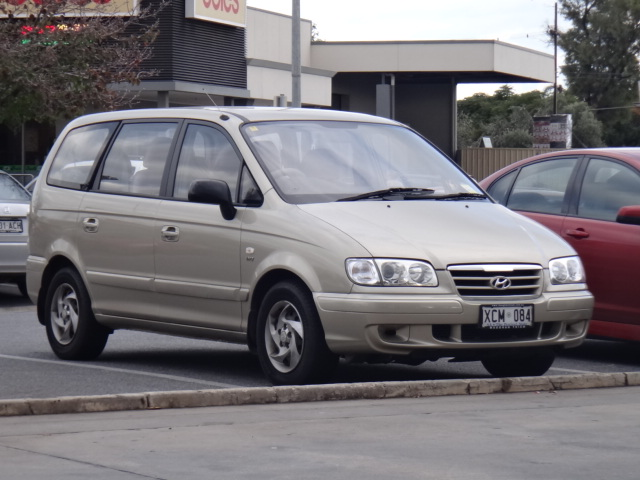
Hyundai Trajet (facelift)

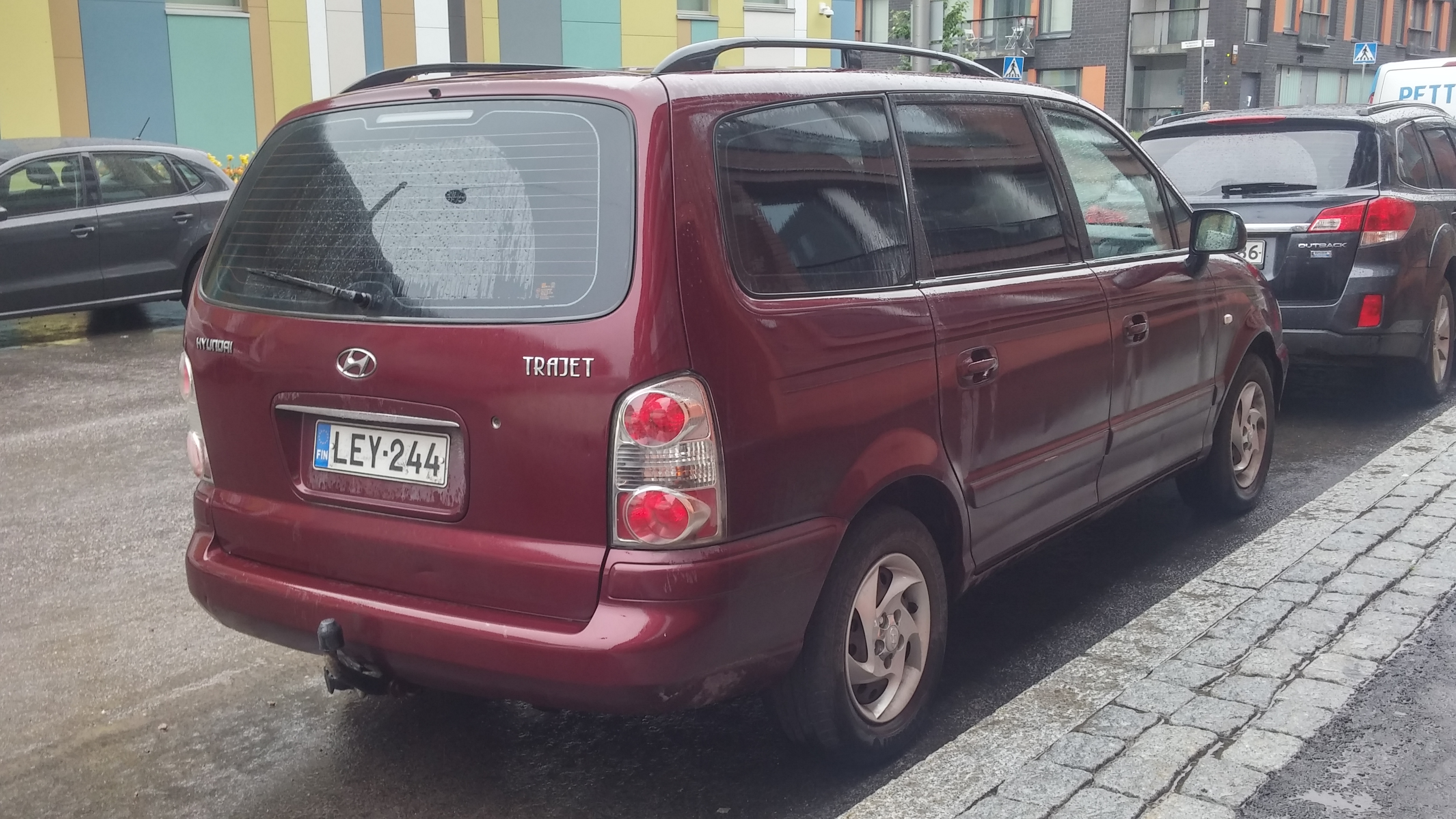
Facelift, rear view
