= Kia Carens =

Compact MPV

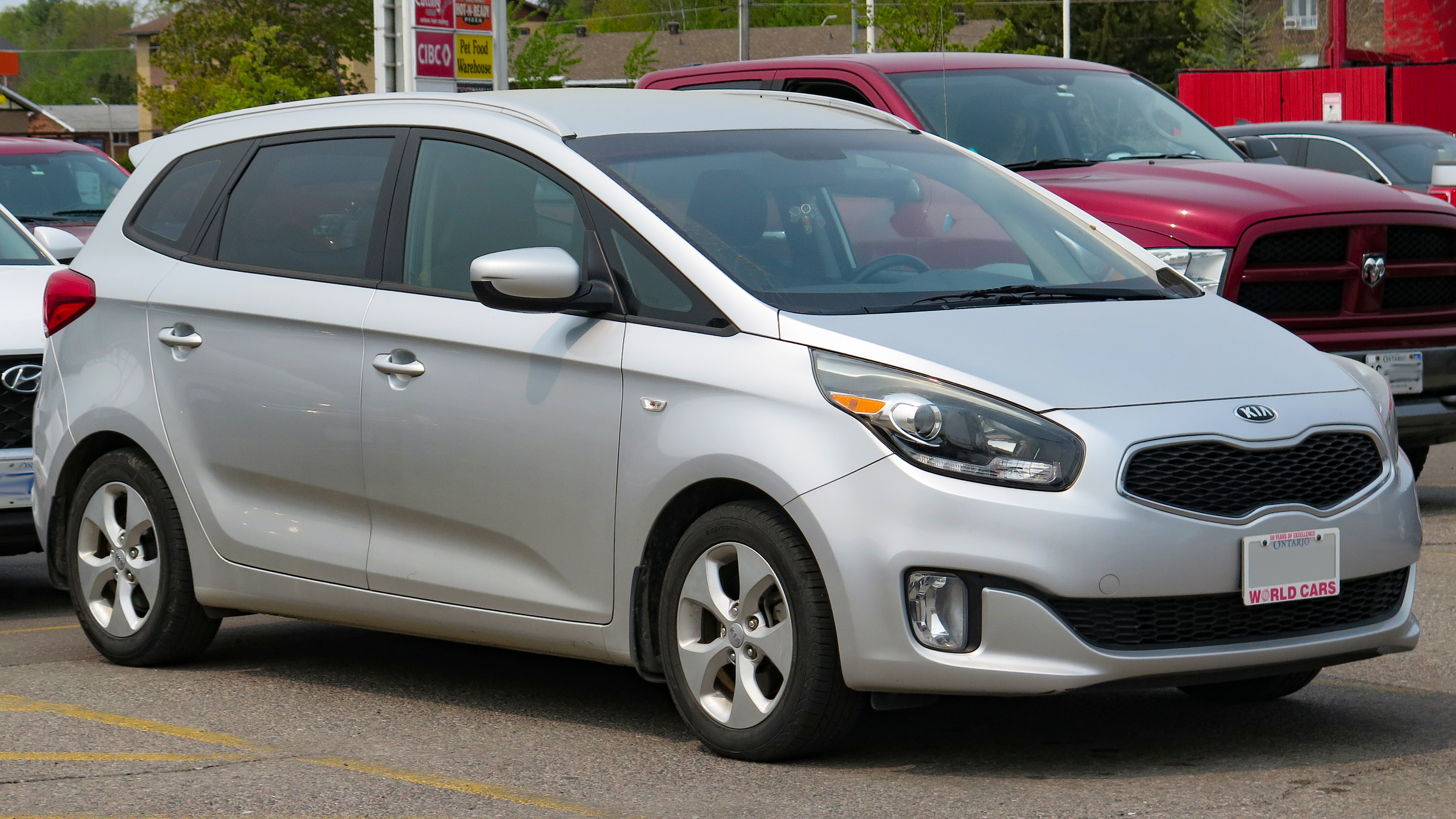
- 2016 Kia Rondo LX

Overview
- Manufacturer: Kia
- Also called: Kia Rondo (North America, 2006–2017)
- Production: 1999–2019; 2021–present

Body and chassis
- Class: Compact MPV
- Body style: 5-door wagon
- Layout: Front-engine, front-wheel-drive

Chronology
- Predecessor: Kia Joice

The Kia Carens (Korean: 기아 카렌스) is a compact MPV manufactured by Kia since 1999, spanning over four generations, and was marketed worldwide under various nameplates, prominently as the Kia Rondo.

The initial three generations had an MPV body style. They were marketed worldwide, with presence in their home country, South Korea, in Europe, and North America since the second generation.

The fourth-generation model came out in the end of 2021, retaining the MPV body style, with some different approach in terms of design and targeted markets, as it was developed as a "strategic model" for the Indian market, and it adopts a crossover-inspired exterior design.

The name "Carens" derives from the word "car" and "renaissance", while the name "Rondo" derives from the musical term Rondo.

== First generation (RS/FJ; 1999) ==
First generation
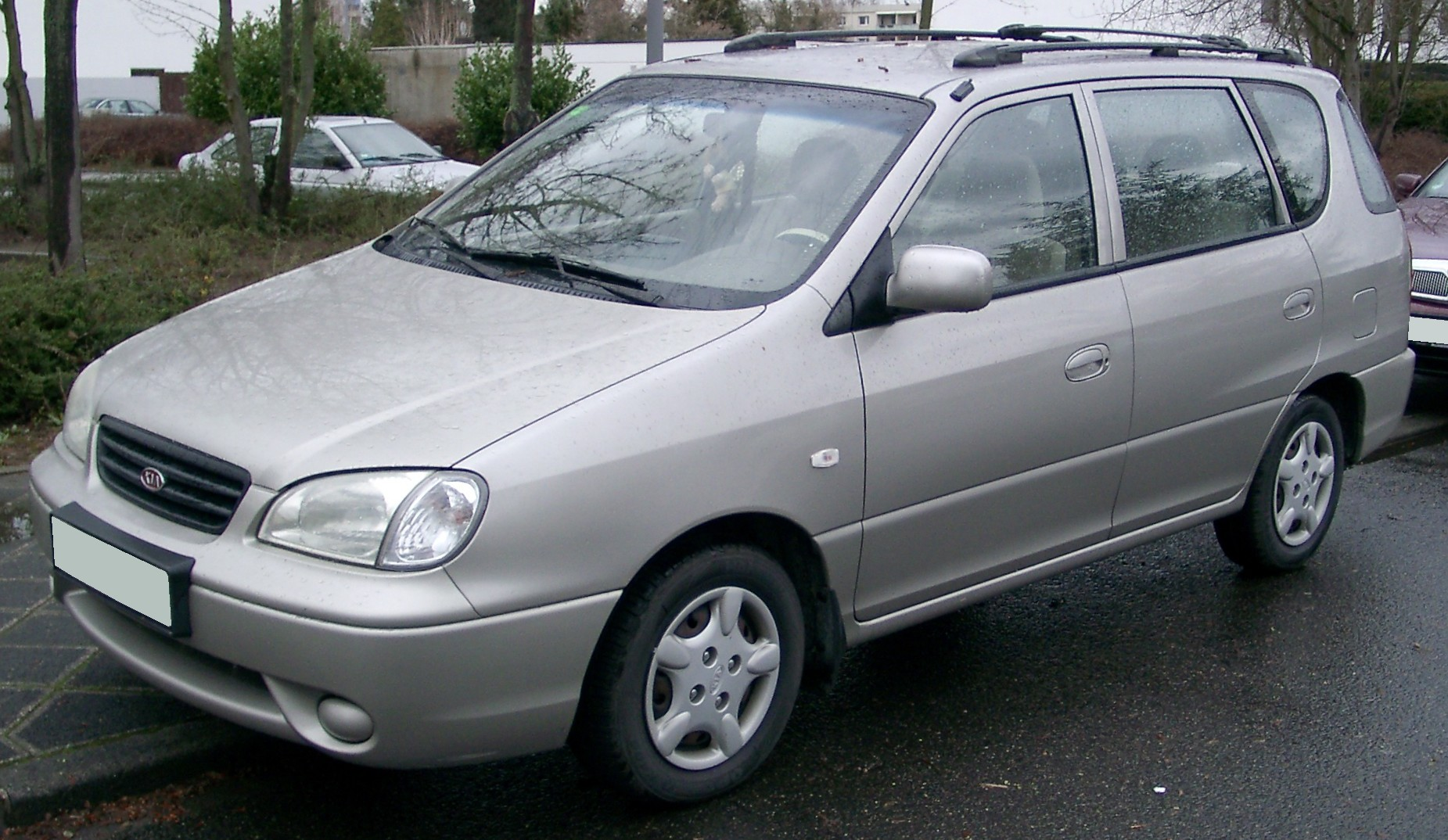
- Pre-facelift (RS)

Overview
- Model code: RS/FJ
- Also called: Kia Euro Carens (Taiwan, facelift); Kia X-Trek (South Korea, diesel facelift); Naza Citra (Malaysia, facelift)
- Production: May 1999 – 2006
- Assembly: South Korea: Hwaseong (Hwaseong Plant); Indonesia: Cikarang (2004–2007); Malaysia: Gurun (NAM); Vietnam: Chu Lai (Chu Lai Plant)

Body and chassis
- Related: Kia Sephia

Powertrain
- Engine: Petrol: 1.8 L FP I4; 2.0 L FS-DE I4; 2.0 L Beta II I4; Petrol/LPG: 2.0 L Beta II LPi I4; Diesel: 2.0 L D CRDI I4
- Transmission: 5-speed manual 4-speed automatic

Dimensions
- Wheelbase: 2,570 mm (101.2 in)
- Length: 4,450 mm (175.2 in); 4,490 mm (176.8 in) (facelift)
- Width: 1,730 mm (68.1 in); 1,750 mm (68.9 in) (facelift)
- Height: 1,600 mm (63.0 in); 1,610 mm (63.4 in) (facelift); 1,685 mm (66.3 in) (X-Trek)

Kia debuted the first generation model of Carens, the RS series in May 1999. It is based on the same platform as the Kia Sephia. A facelift was issued in 2002.

The model was discontinued in Australia in 2001, with production continuing elsewhere for the updated model which was launched in 2002.

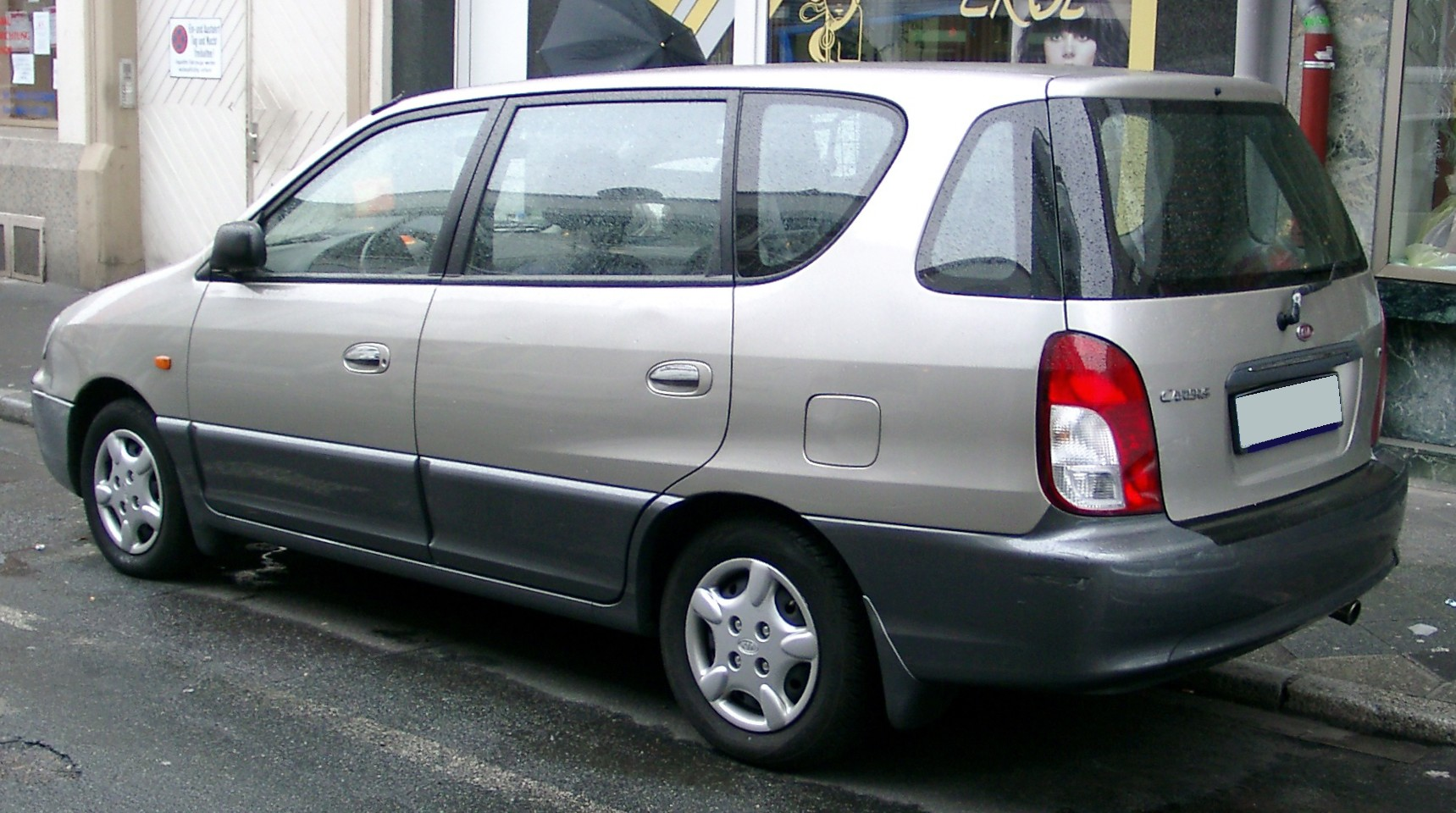
Kia Carens LS (Germany; pre-facelift)

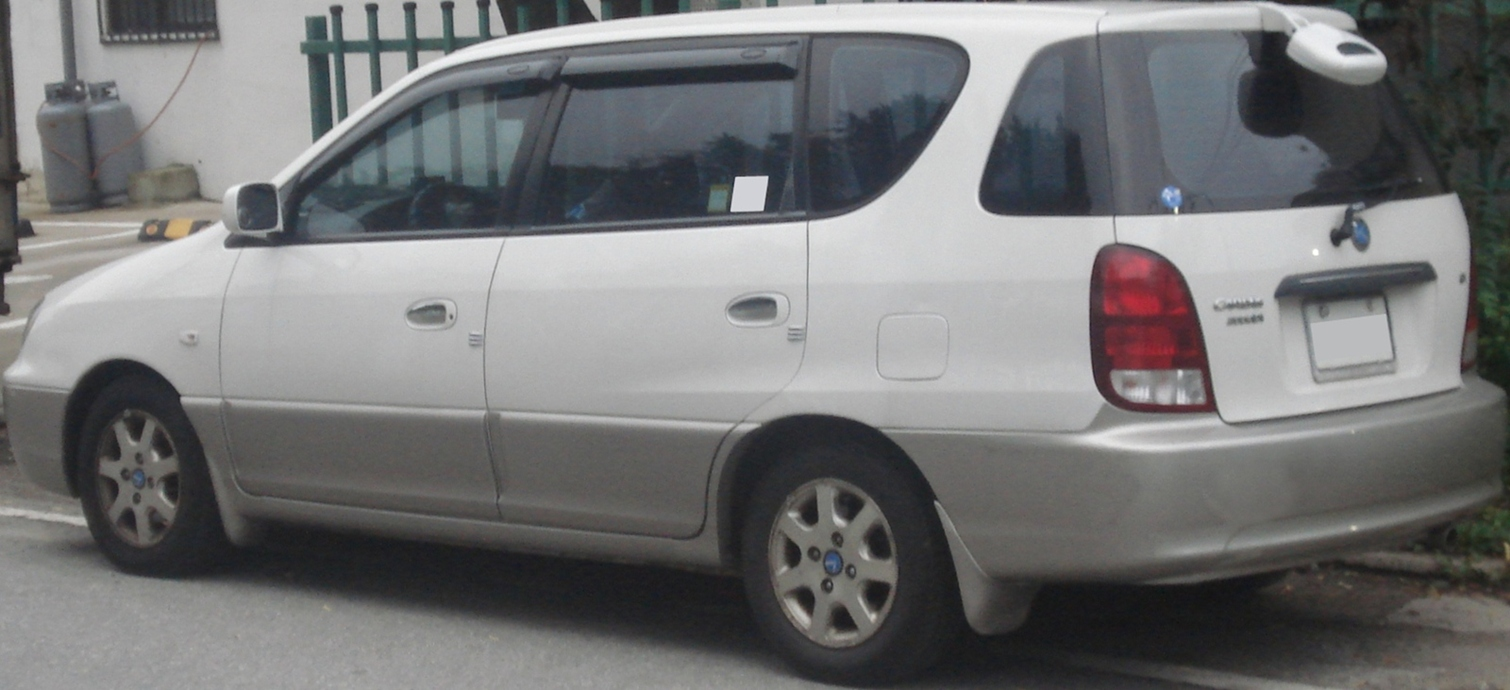
Kia Carens (South Korea; pre-facelift)

=== Facelift ===
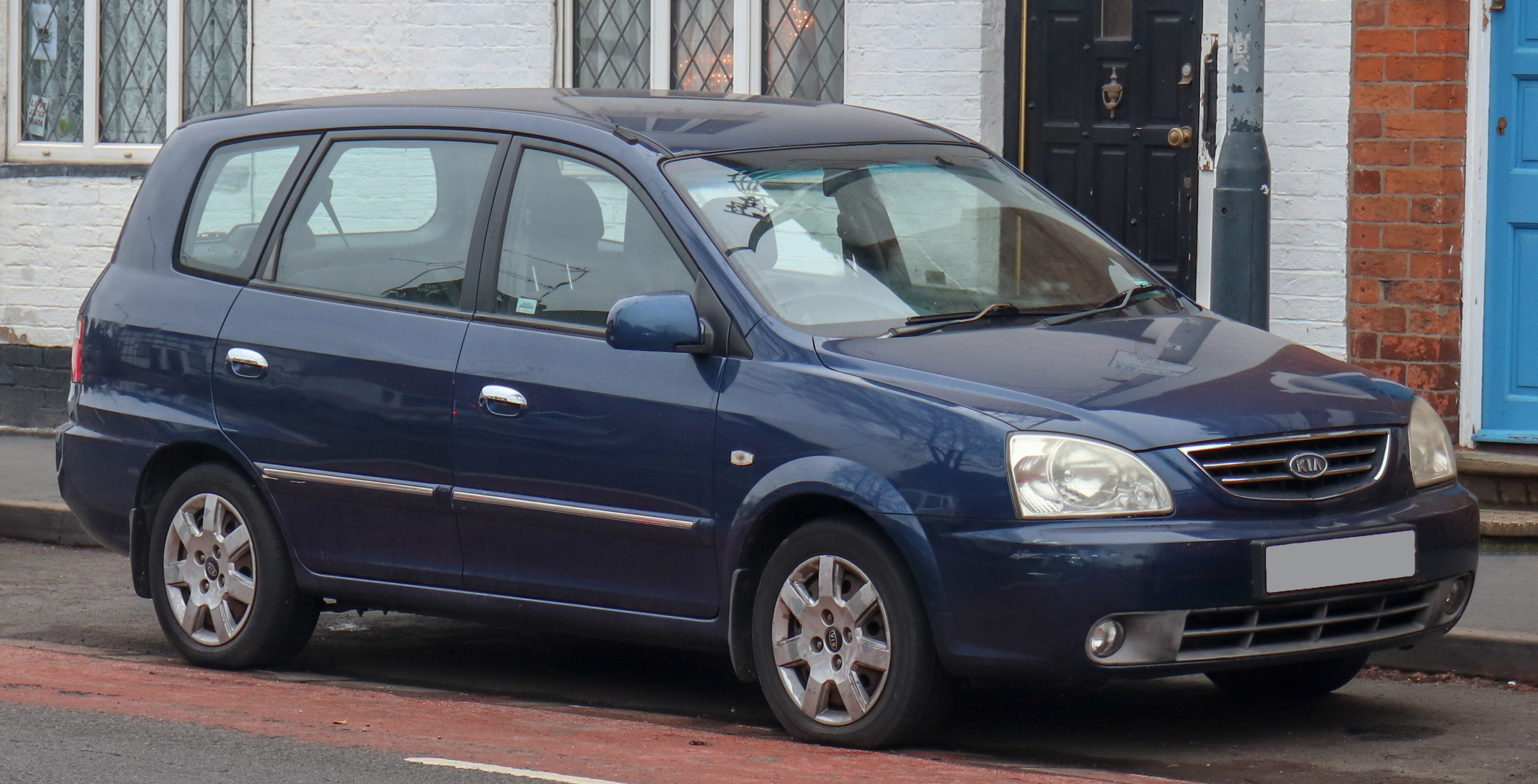
Facelift (front)

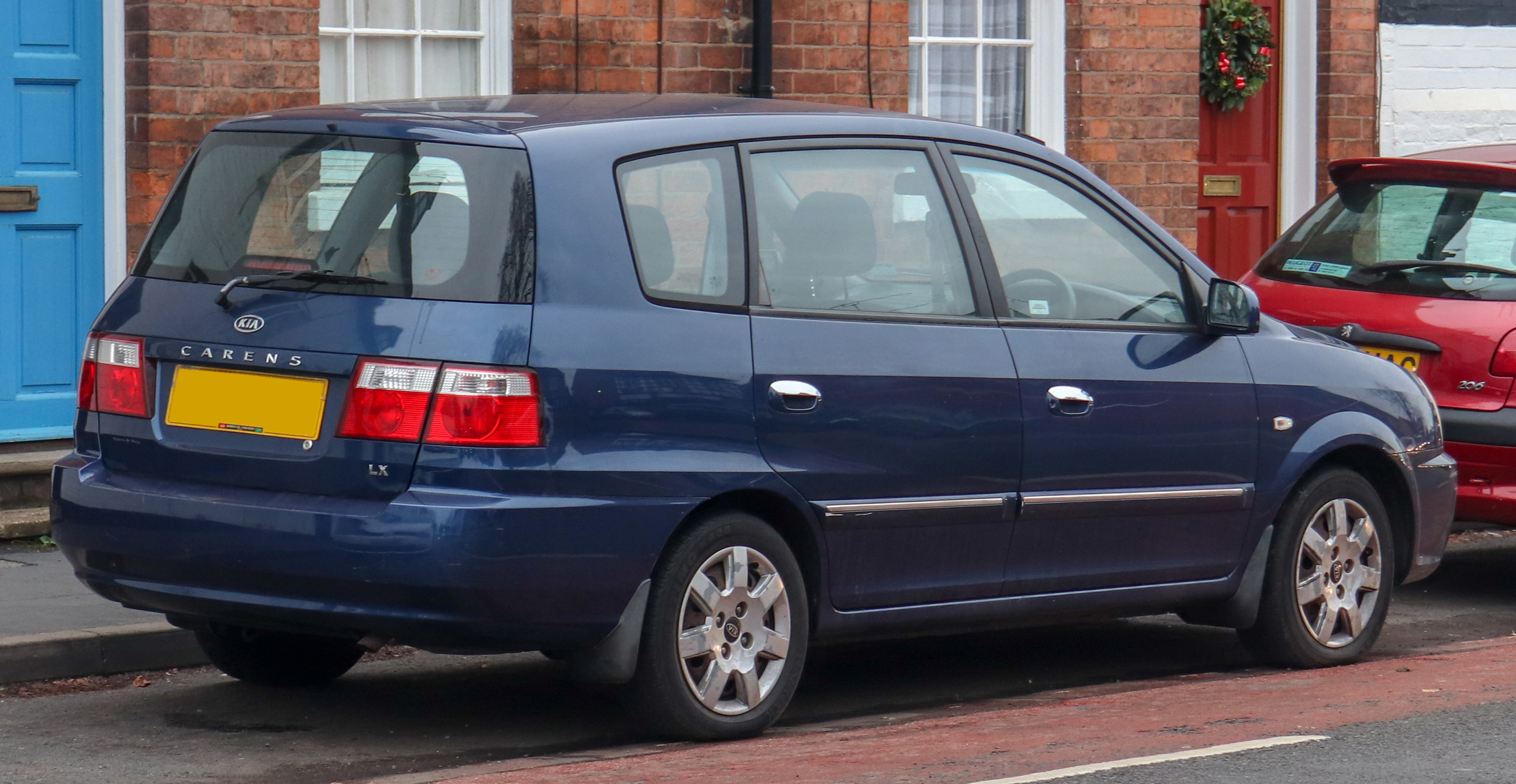
Facelift (rear)

=== Malaysia ===
The first-generation vehicle was initially sold in Malaysia as the Kia Carens. Since January 2005, the Kia Carens was rebadged as the Naza Citra by Naza. The Naza Citra was updated in June 2009.

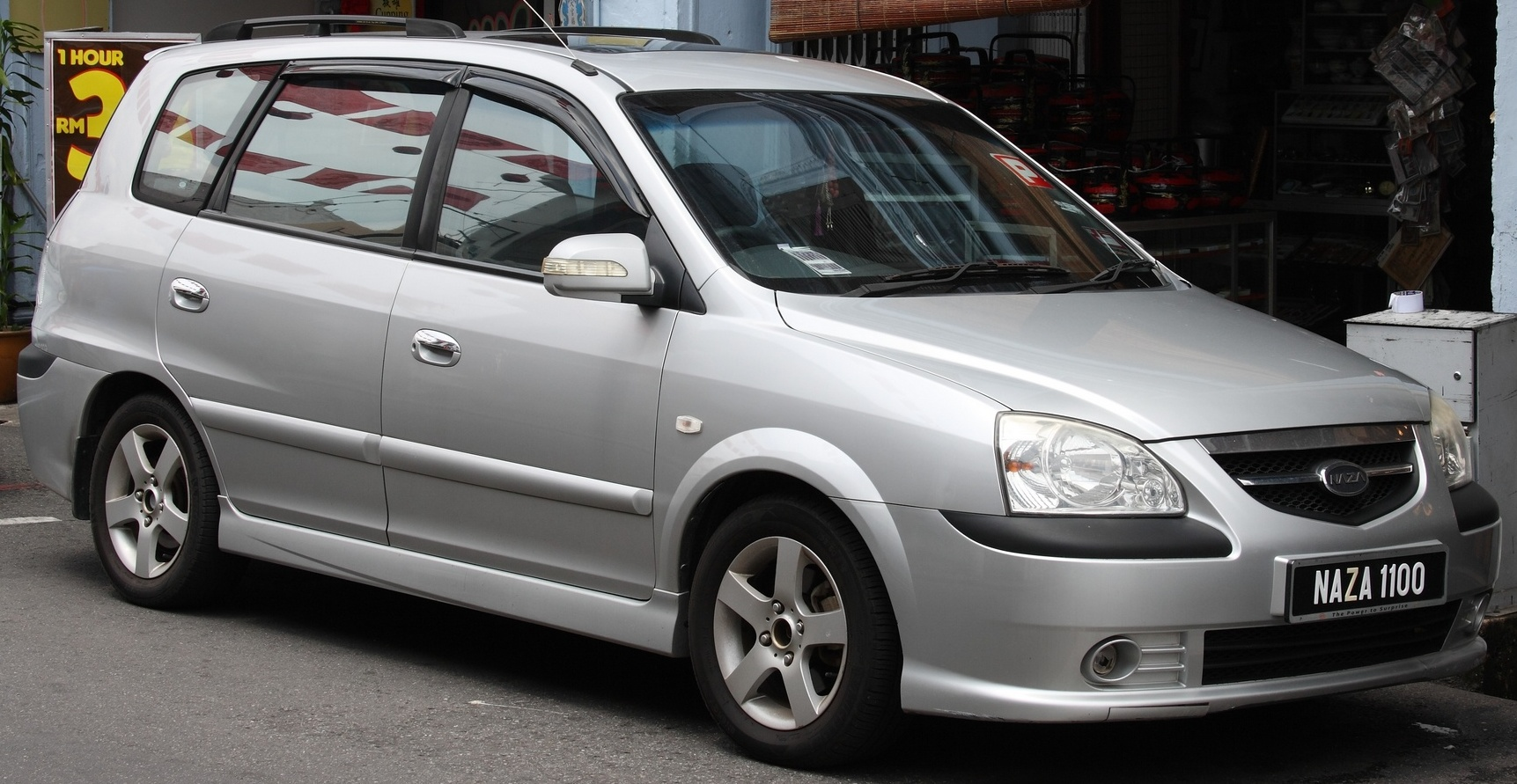
Naza Citra (Malaysia)

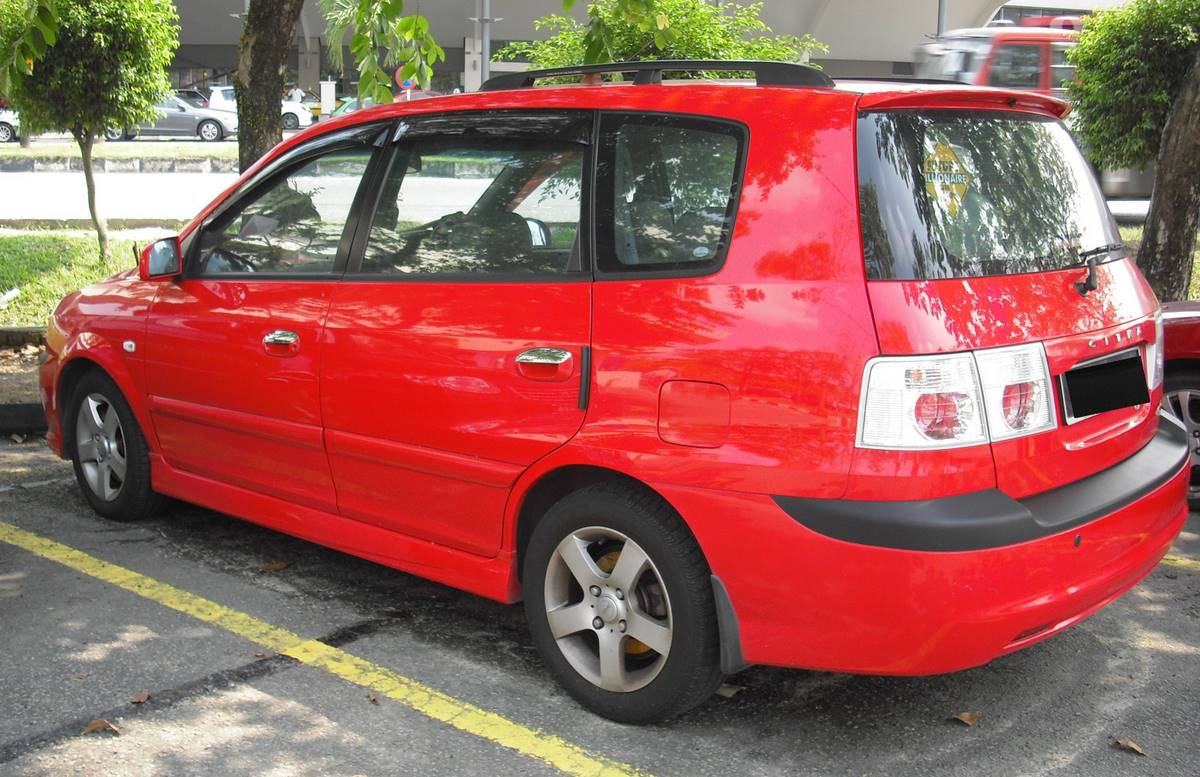
Naza Citra (Malaysia)

== Second generation (UN; 2006) ==
Second generation
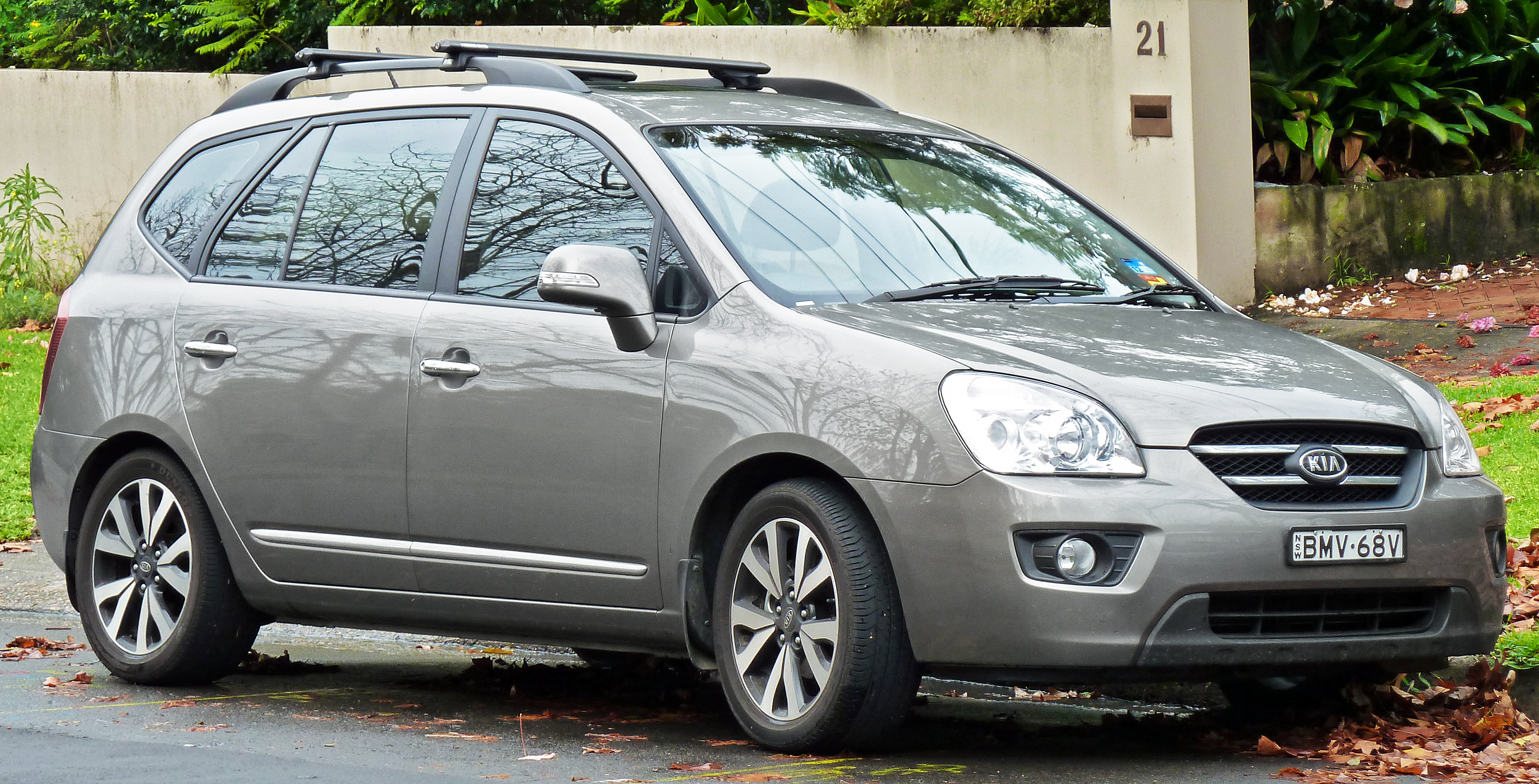
- Pre-facelift

Overview
- Model code: UN
- Also called: Kia Euro Carens (Taiwan); Kia Rondo (North America); Kia Rondo7 (Australia); Naza Citra 2 Rondo (Malaysia)
- Production: 2006–2013
- Model years: 2007–2010 (USA); 2007–2013 (Canada)
- Assembly: South Korea: Gwangju (Gwangju Plant); Malaysia: Gurun (NAM); France: Annonay (Kia France); Vietnam: Chu Lai (THACO Kia)

Powertrain
- Engine: Petrol: 2.0 L Theta I4; 2.4 L Theta I4; 2.4 L Theta II I4; 2.7 L Mu V6; Petrol/LPG: 2.0 L Theta I4; Diesel: 1.6 L U CRDi I4; 2.0 L D CRDi I4
- Transmission: 5-speed manual 6-speed manual 4-speed automatic 5-speed automatic

Dimensions
- Wheelbase: 2,700 mm (106.3 in)
- Length: 4,545 mm (178.9 in)
- Width: 1,820 mm (71.7 in)
- Height: 1,650–1,720 mm (65.0–67.7 in)
- Curb weight: 1,515 kg (3,340.0 lb)

The second generation Carens, known as the UN series, was launched in 2006. The Carens/Rondo followed Kia's introduction at the Frankfurt Motor Show of the Multi-S, essentially the Carens/Rondo in concept form — the S standing for Sporty, Spacious and Smart. The Multi-S differed significantly from the production model, only its inclusion of a dual panel sunroof running the length of the roof. In North America and Australia, the car is called the Rondo and Rondo7 respectively.

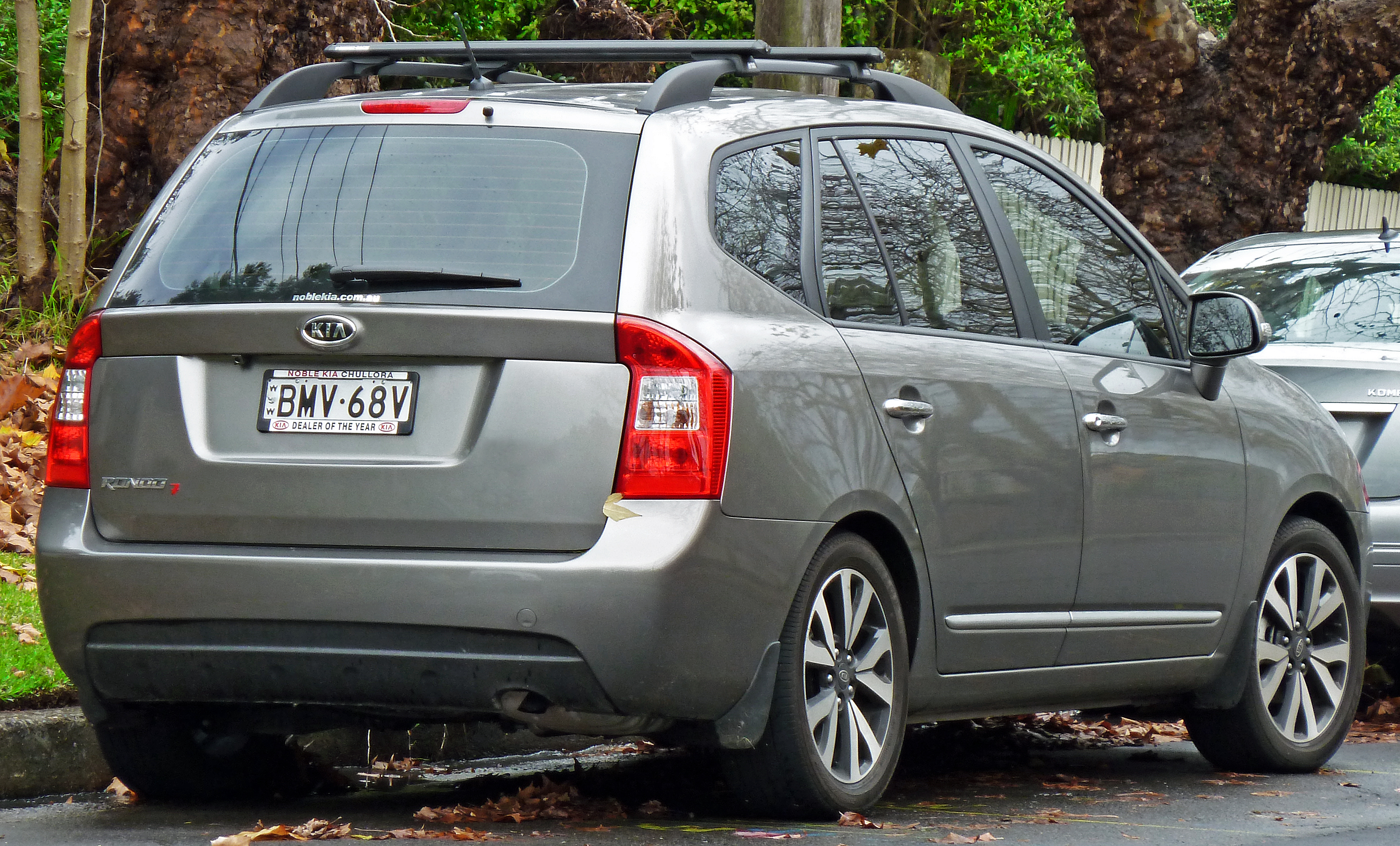
Rear (pre-facelift)

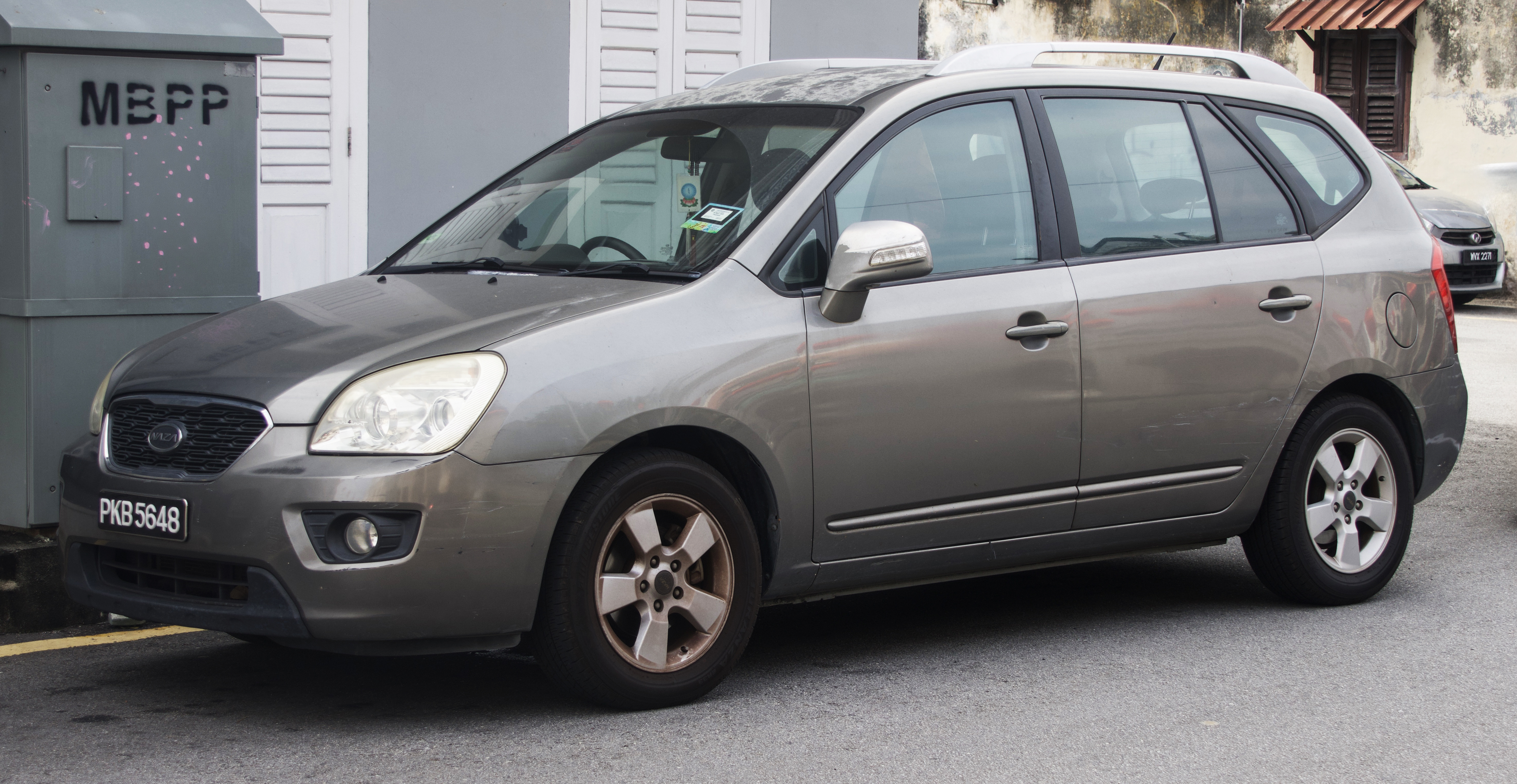
Naza Citra II (pre-facelift)

The Rondo made its public debut at the 2006 Los Angeles International Auto Show, with the 2007 model's North American sales debut in December 2006 in Canada and early 2007 in the United States. In Australia, sales commenced April 2008.

In the United States, Kia sold more than 20,000 units in each of the first two model years exceeding internal sales goals. Sales rapidly declined in the 2009 model year and remained low in 2010, its final model year.

=== North America ===
Available as a five or optional seven passenger vehicle with either a standard 175 hp 2.4-litre 4-cylinder engine or an optional 192 hp 2.7-litre V6 engine in two trim levels. In Australia, it is only available as a seven-passenger vehicle with a 2.0-litre four cylinder engine and a choice of an automatic or manual transmission, depending on trim level. The V6 was Kia's last engine to use a timing belt instead of a timing chain.

Standard features depending on market include: sixteen inch alloy wheels, AM/FM/CD player/Sirius Satellite Radio/MP3 Capability, iPod auxiliary jack, air conditioning, power windows and door locks, front/side/full length Side curtain airbags, four wheel disc brakes, ABS, electronic stability control, tire pressure monitoring system, LATCH, child safety door locks, tilt steering column, front and rear twelve volt outlets, front and rear cup holders.

Options include: moonroof, leather interior, heated front seats, cruise control, keyless entry, Infinity ten speaker stereo, automated climate control.

As of August 2010, Kia discontinued the Rondo in the United States and continued to market the 2011 facelifted Carens/Rondo in Canada, adopting Kia's new grille.

=== Facelift ===
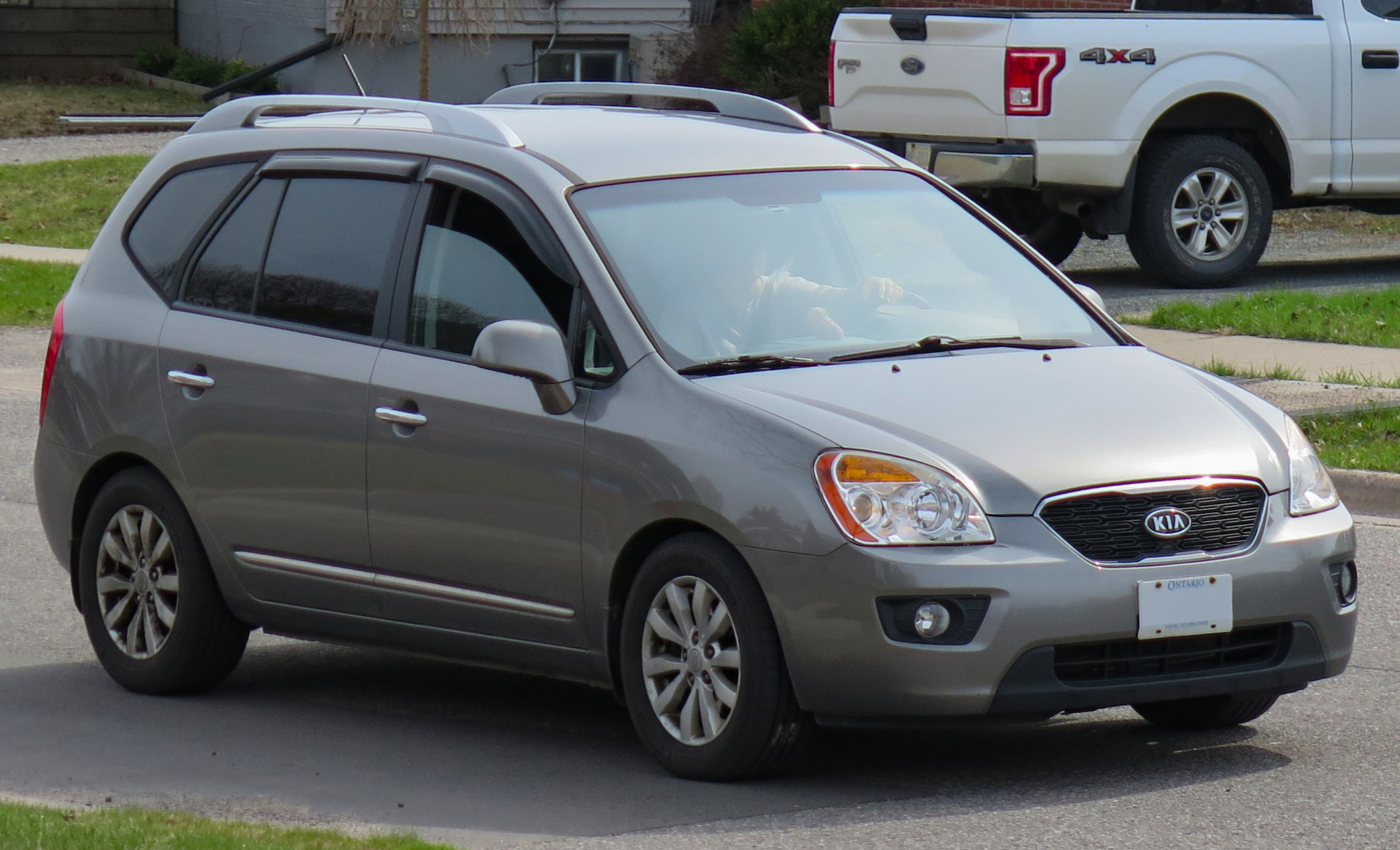
Facelift

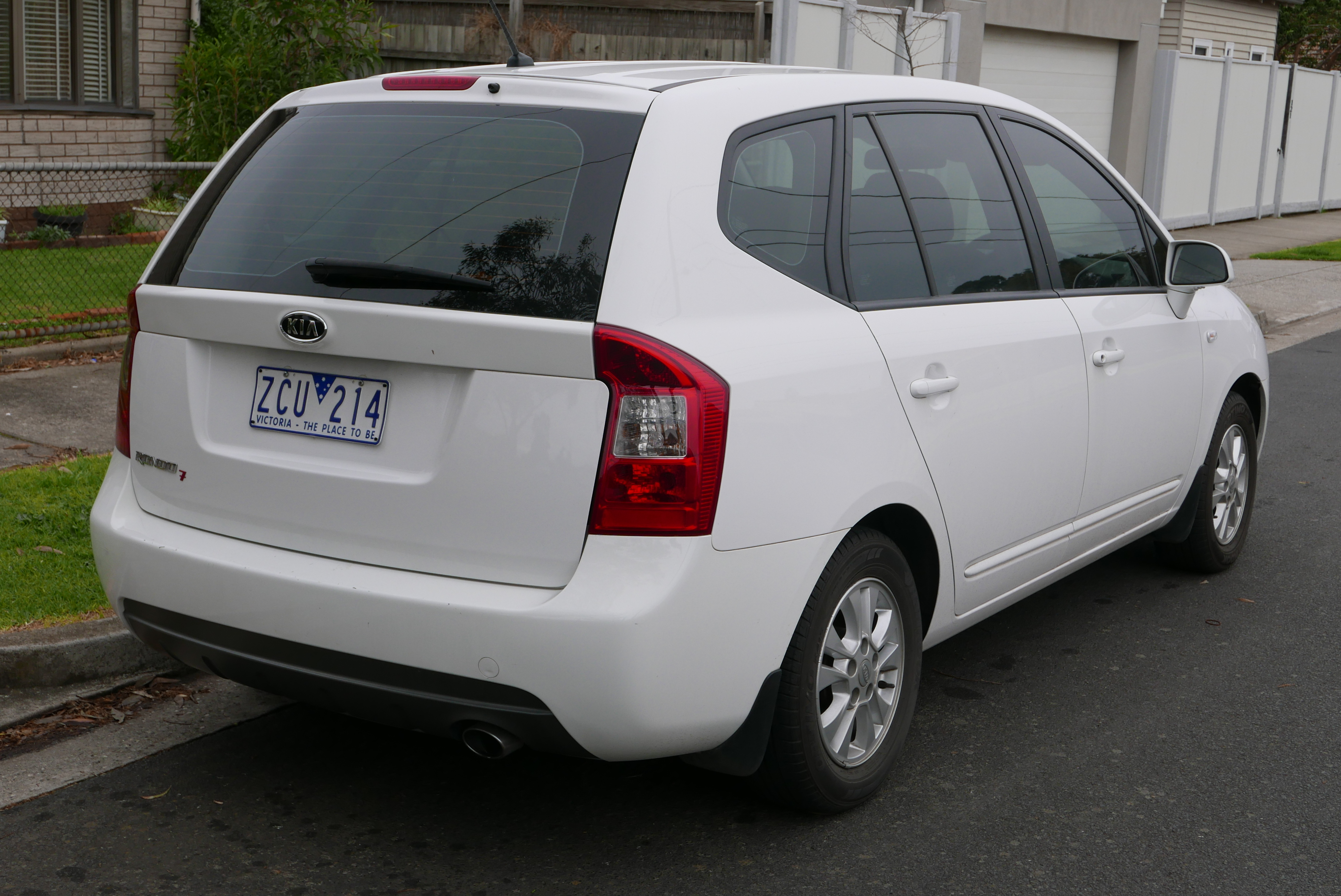
Facelift

=== Safety ===
ANCAP test results* Kia Rondo / Carens variant(s) as tested (2008)
Test	Score
Overall	4 /5 stars
Frontal offset	9.21/16
Side impact	15/16
Pole	2/2
Seat belt reminders	1/3
Whiplash protection	Not Assessed
Pedestrian protection	Poor
Electronic stability control	Standard

== Third generation (RP; 2013) ==
Third generation
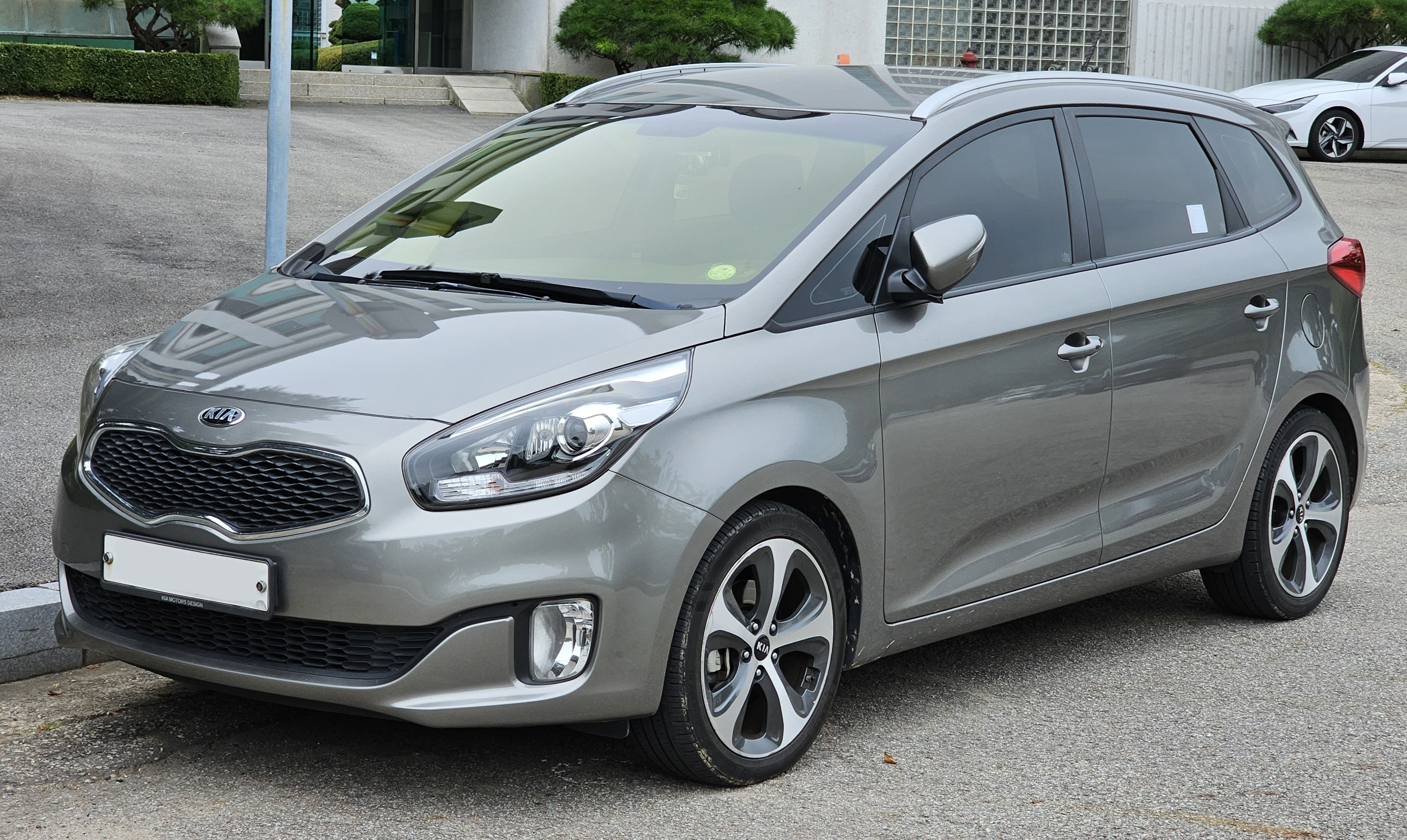
- Pre-facelift

Overview
- Model code: RP
- Also called: Kia Rondo (Canada, 2013–2017)
- Production: 2013–2019 (global); 2014–2022 (Vietnam)
- Assembly: South Korea: Gwangju (Gwangju Plant); Vietnam: Chu Lai (THACO Kia); Taiwan: SYM Motors

Powertrain
- Engine: Petrol: 1.6 L Gamma GDi I4; 2.0 L Nu I4; 2.0 L Nu GDi I4; Petrol/LPG: 2.0 L Nu I4; Diesel: 1.7 L U II CRDI turbo I4
- Transmission: 6-speed manual 6-speed automatic 7-speed DCT

Dimensions
- Wheelbase: 2,750 mm (108.3 in)
- Length: 4,525 mm (178.1 in)
- Width: 1,805 mm (71.1 in)
- Height: 1,610 mm (63.4 in)

Kia debuted the third-generation Carens (codename: RP) in September 2012 at the 2012 Paris Motor Show. The V6 from the second generation has been dropped, and in its place is the option of a 2.0-litre Nu four-cylinder GDI petrol, producing 122 kW (166 PS; 164 hp) and 213 N⋅m (157 lb⋅ft), or a 1.7-litre U2 four-cylinder diesel producing 100 kW (136 PS; 134 hp) and 320 N⋅m (236 lb⋅ft), both paired either with a six-speed manual or a six-speed automatic. A 1.6-litre GDI petrol engine was also available in the UK. The Carens is offered in either 5-seat or 7-seat configurations. Sales began in March 2013 in South Korea.

In North America, the third generation Kia Rondo was only available in Canada, due to slow sales in the United States. Sales in Canada ended after the 2017 model year.

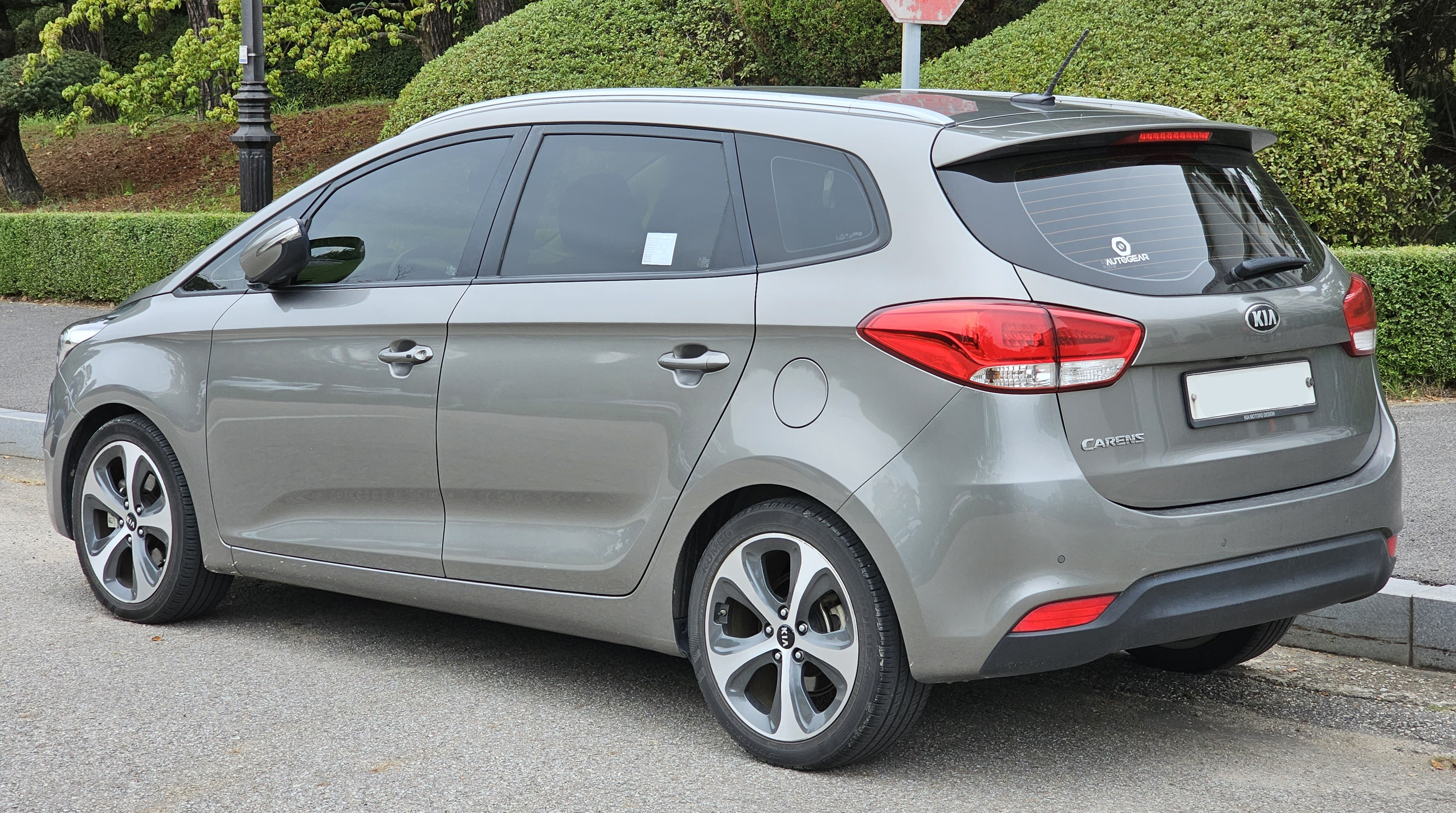
Rear view (pre-facelift)

=== Update ===
In September 2016, the Carens was given a minor facelift with redesigned fascias, wheels and lights, as well as an enlarged "Tiger Nose" grille. The 1.7-litre diesel was retuned for a slight output increase and produced 104 kW (141 PS; 139 hp) and 340 N⋅m (251 lb⋅ft), while its 6-speed automatic transmission was replaced with a 7-speed dual-clutch transmission.

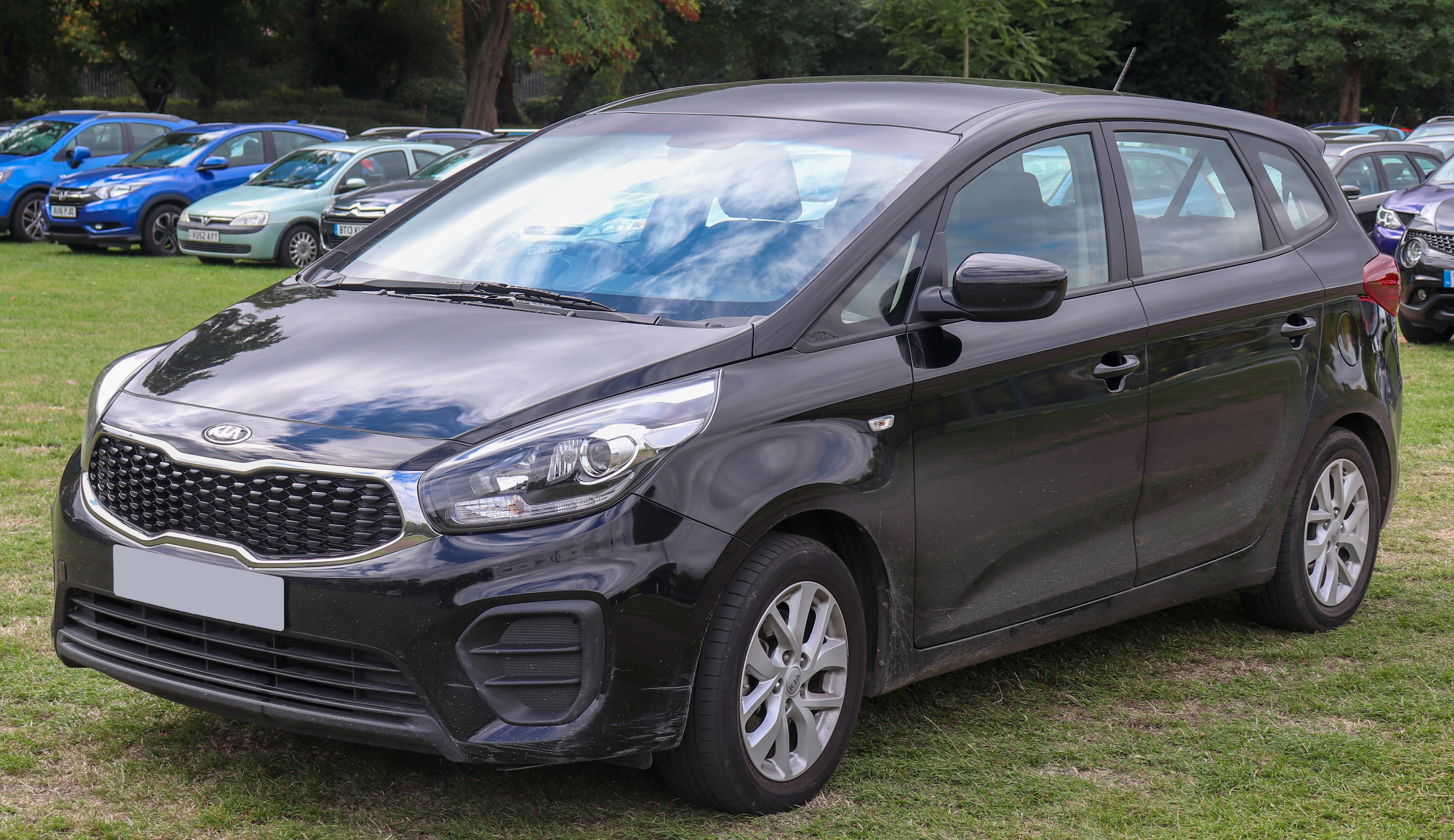
2017 Kia Carens (facelift)

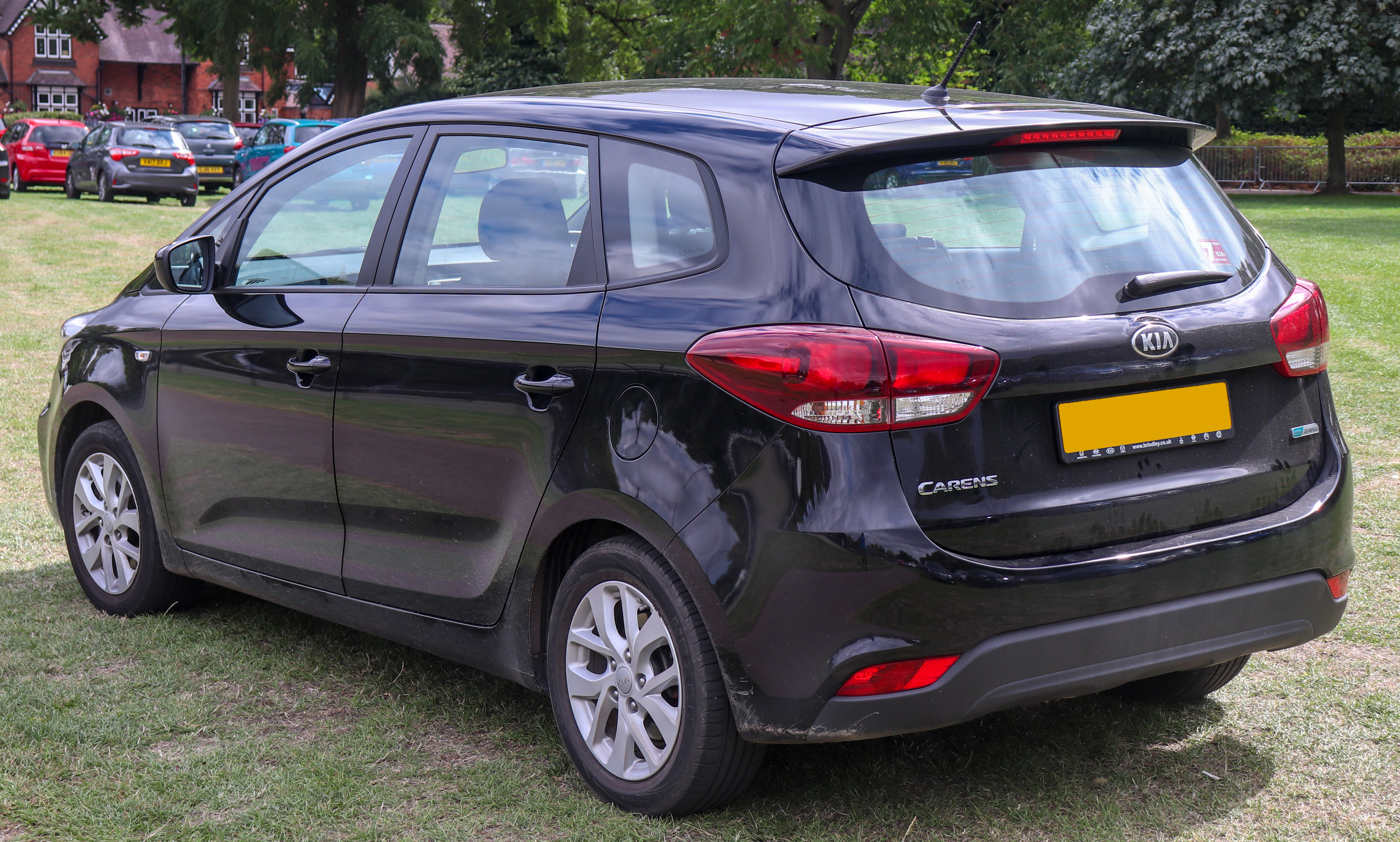
Rear view

=== Marketing ===
In March 2013, Kia Motors collaborated with DreamWorks Animation to cross promote the Carens with the film The Croods.

=== Safety ===
ANCAP test results* Kia Rondo / Carens all variants (2013)
Test	Score
Overall	5 /5 stars
Frontal offset	15.20/16
Side impact	16/16
Pole	2/2
Seat belt reminders	3/3
Whiplash protection	Good
Pedestrian protection	Adequate
Electronic stability control	Standard

ANCAP test results* Kia Rondo / Carens all variants (2013)
Test	Score
Overall	5 /5 stars
Frontal offset	15.20/16
Side impact	16/16
Pole	2/2
Seat belt reminders	3/3
Whiplash protection	Good
Pedestrian protection	Adequate
Electronic stability control	Standard

== Fourth generation (KY; 2021) ==
Fourth generation
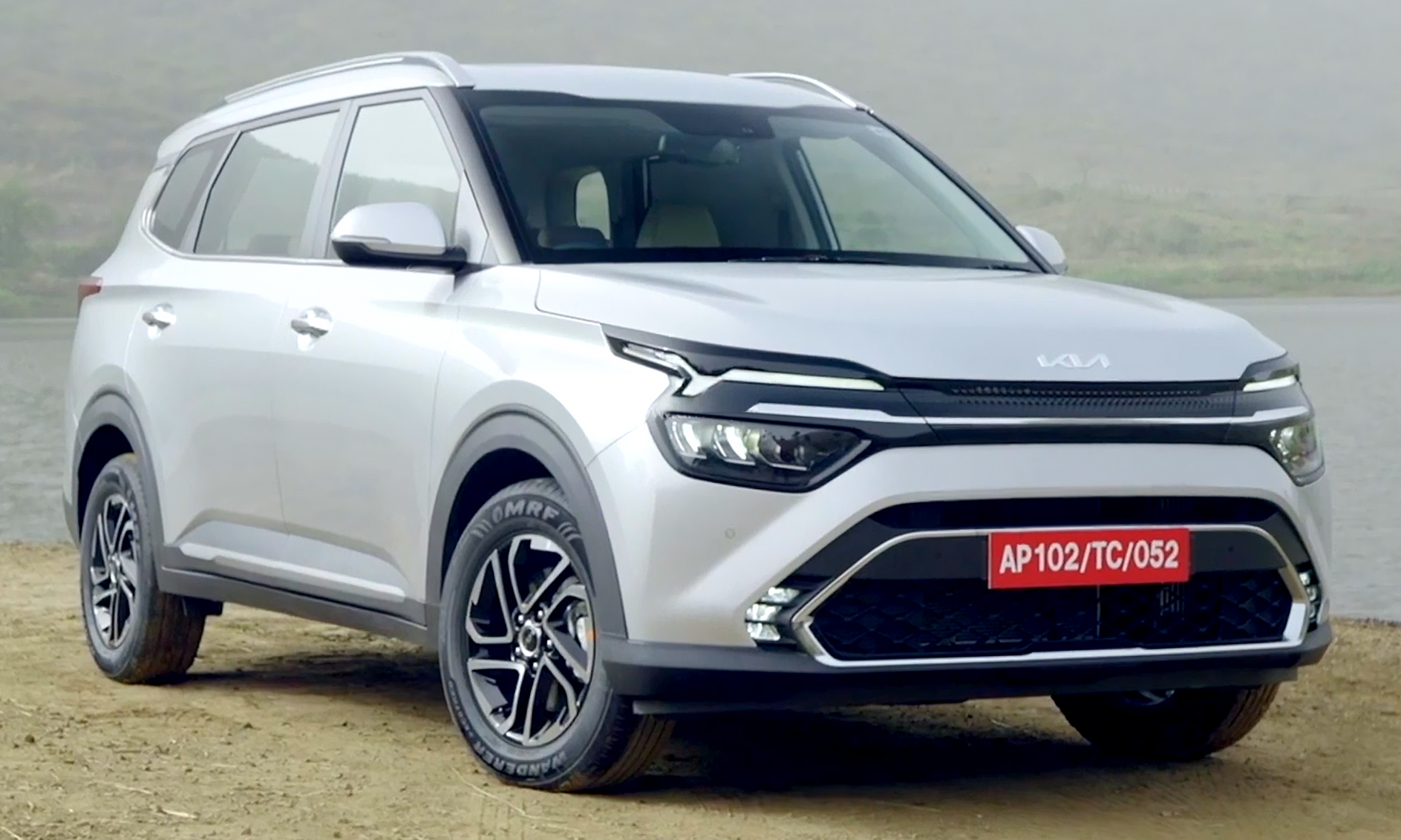
- 2022 Kia Carens 1.4 Luxury Plus (India) (pre-facelift)

Overview
- Model code: KY
- Also called: Hyundai Neira (electric, Indonesia; 2026–present)
- Production: December 2021 – present
- Assembly: India: Anantapur, Andhra Pradesh (Kia India); Vietnam: Chu Lai (THACO Kia); Bangladesh: Sreepur Upazila, Gazipur (Meghna Group); Indonesia: Cikarang, West Java (HMMI, EV only)
- Designer: Jochen Paesen (Interior); Taek-Gyun Kim (Exterior)

Body and chassis
- Platform: Hyundai-Kia K2
- Related: Kia Seltos (SP2i); Hyundai Stargazer

Powertrain
- Engine: Petrol: 1.4 L G4LD turbo GDi I4; 1.5 L G4FL I4; 1.5 L G4FS turbo GDi I4; Petrol/CNG: 1.5 L G4FL I4; Diesel: 1.5 L D4FA CRDi I4
- Transmission: 6-speed manual; 6-speed automatic; 7-speed DCT; CVT

Dimensions
- Wheelbase: 2,780 mm (109.4 in)
- Length: 4,540 mm (178.7 in)
- Width: 1,800 mm (70.9 in)
- Height: 1,700–1,708 mm (66.9–67.2 in)

The fourth-generation Carens was first unveiled in India on 16 December 2021.

It was developed under the codename "KY". Based on a stretched Seltos/Hyundai Creta platform, it is mainly marketed for India and other emerging markets as opposed to previous generations. It is marketed by Kia as a "recreational vehicle" (RV) with 6-seater and 7-seater configurations offered and was developed with an emphasis on space for third-row seat occupants.

The model shared the same powertrain and gearbox options as the Indian-made Seltos, consisting of two petrol engines and one diesel engine. The petrol engines are 1.5-litre naturally aspirated engine that makes 115 PS (85 kW; 113 hp) paired with six-speed manual transmission or CVT, and a 1.4-litre Smartstream turbocharged engine that produces 140 PS (103 kW; 138 hp) paired with six-speed manual transmission or a seven-speed dual-clutch transmission. The diesel engine is a 1.5-litre U-Line unit that produces 115 PS (85 kW; 113 hp) paired with six-speed manual transmission or six-speed torque-converter automatic.

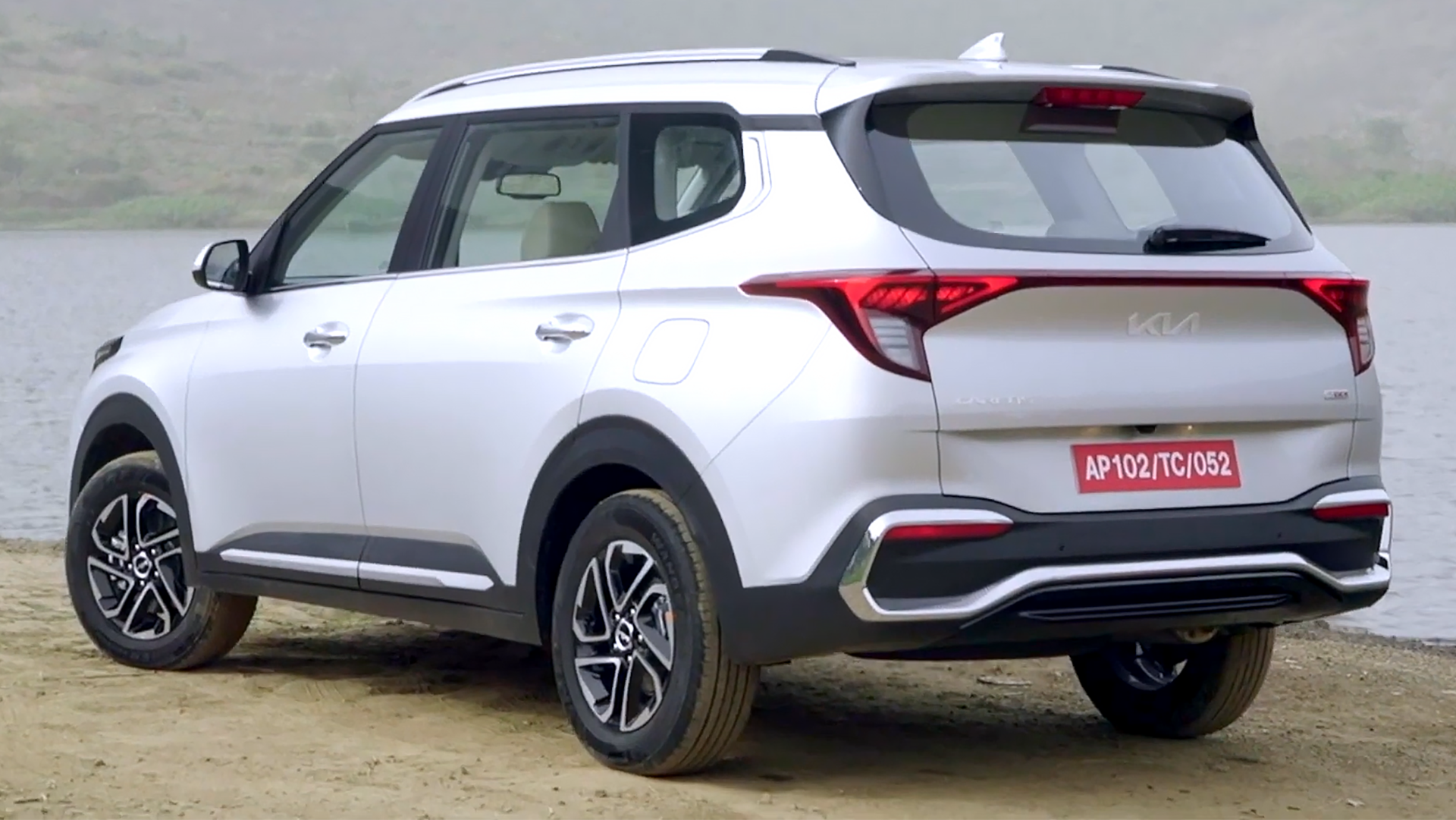
Rear view

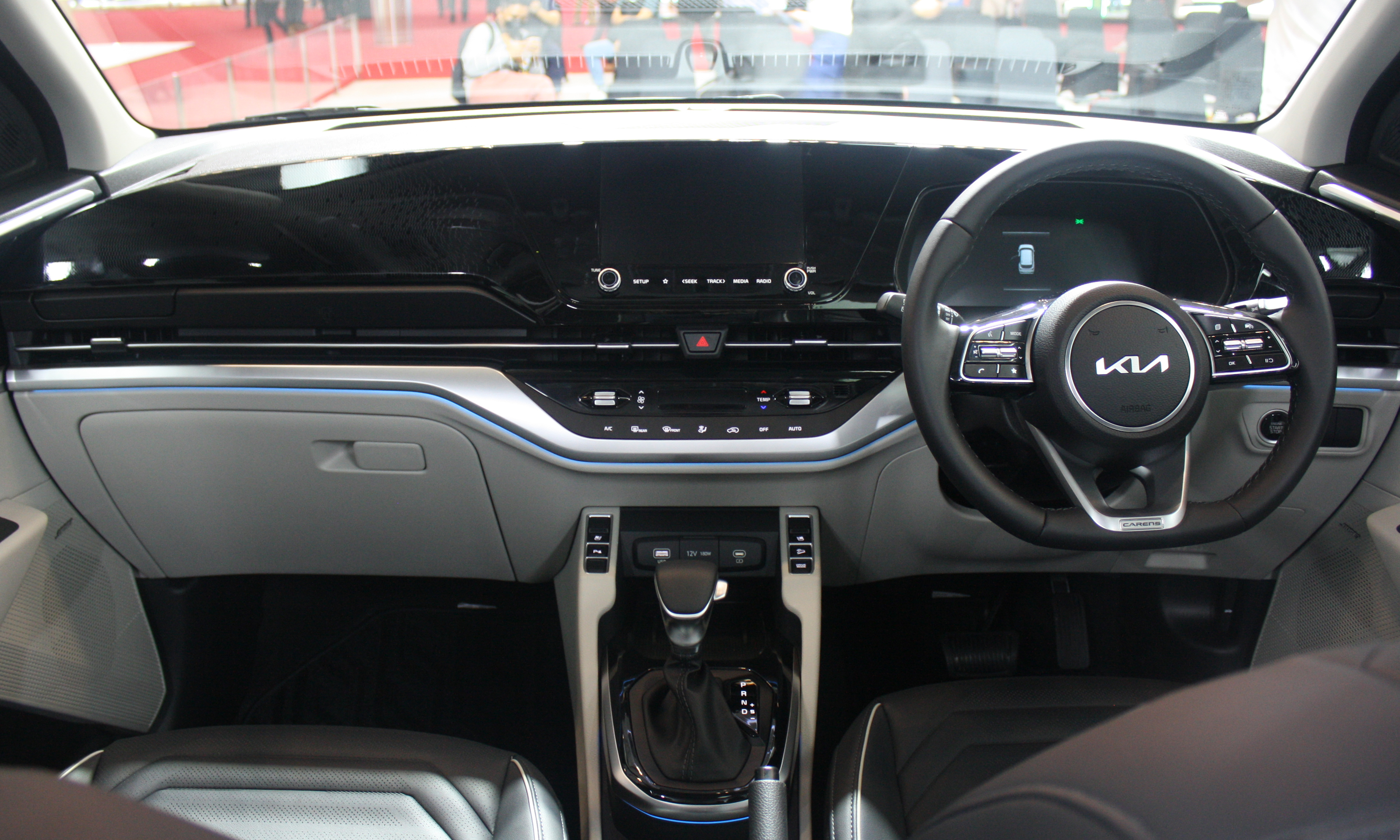
Interior

=== 2025 facelift (Carens Clavis) ===
In May 2025, Kia introduced the facelifted Carens called the Carens Clavis in India, an updated version of the existing MPV lineup.

The facelifted Carens introduces a redesigned exterior with a revised front and rear fascia with connected LED lamps. The interior includes dual 12.25-inch displays with one for the infotainment system and another as a digital instrument cluster. Additional features include a panoramic sunroof, ventilated front seats, a Bose premium audio system, ambient lighting, wireless charging, and a 4-way power-adjustable driver's seat. Safety equipment addition includes Level 2 ADAS.

The facelifted Carens is offered with three engine options: a 1.5-litre naturally aspirated petrol engine, a 1.5-litre turbocharged petrol engine (replacing the 1.4-litre turbocharged petrol engine), and a 1.5-litre diesel engine. Transmission choices include a 6-speed manual transmission, a 6-speed intelligent manual transmission (iMT), and a 7-speed dual-clutch transmission (DCT).

In India, the pre-facelifted model was sold alongside the facelifted model in a single trim called Premium (O), and the Carens Clavis is marketed simply as the facelifted Carens outside India.

Carens Clavis

Rear view

Interior

==== Carens EV / Carens Clavis EV ====
The Carens EV, also known in India as the Carens Clavis EV, is a battery electric variant of the facelifted Carens, and it is Kia's first electric vehicle manufactured in India.

It was launched on 15 July 2025. Bookings for the Carens Clavis EV in India commenced on 22 July 2025, a few weeks after the electric vehicle was launched.

It is available in Standard Range and Long Range models, featuring battery options of 42 kWh or 51.4 kWh, which offer a range of up to 490 km (as per ARAI standards). The electric motor produces 99 kW (133 hp; 135 PS) for the Standard Range model. 126 kW (169 hp; 171 PS) for the Long Range model. Equipment changes compared to the petrol and diesel-powered models include paddle shifters for regenerative braking, and the exclusion of a 6-seater captain seat option for the second row seats.

A Hyundai-badged variant of the Carens EV will be produced and marketed in Indonesia as the Hyundai Neira, which was showcased at the 33th Gaikindo Indonesia International Auto Show in July 2026 as a prototype model. At the same show, Kia also displayed the Carens EV Concept, marking the first appearance of the Carens EV outside India.

=== Markets ===
==== India ====
The fourth-generation Carens was launched in India on 15 February 2022, with five trim levels: Premium, Prestige, Prestige Plus, Luxury and Luxury Plus. All trims come standard as a 7-seater configuration, while the 6-seater configuration with captain seats is available for the Luxury Plus trim. The 1.5-litre petrol engine (6-speed manual) was available for the Premium and Prestige trims, while the 1.4-litre turbocharged petrol (6-speed manual/7-speed DCT) and 1.5-litre turbocharged diesel (6-speed manual/6-speed automatic) engines were available for all trims.

The facelifted model called the Carens Clavis was launched in India on 23 May 2025, with seven trim levels: HTE, HTE (O), HTK, HTK Plus, HTK Plus (O), HTX and HTX Plus. All trims come standard as a 7-seater configuration, while the 6-seater configuration with captain seats is available for the HTX Plus trim. The 1.5-litre petrol engine (6-speed manual) was available for the HTE, HTE (O) and HTK trims, the 1.5-litre turbocharged petrol (6-speed manual transmission/6-speed intelligent manual transmission (iMT)/7-speed DCT) was available for all trims except for the HTE, and the 1.5-litre turbocharged diesel engine (6-speed manual/6-speed automatic) was available for all trims except for the HTX Plus. Since the launch of Carens Clavis, the pre-facelift Carens is available in the single 7-seater, Premium (O) trim.

The battery electric variant, called the Carens Clavis EV, was launched in India on 15 July 2025. It is based on the facelifted model, and is available in three trim levels: HTK (Standard Range), HTX (Standard Range/Long Range) and HTX+ (Long Range).

==== Indonesia ====
The fourth-generation Carens was first introduced in Indonesia at the 2022 Gaikindo Jakarta Auto Week on 12 March 2022, and was launched at the 29th Gaikindo Indonesia International Auto Show on 11 August 2022. At launch, it was available in the sole Premiere trim, powered by either a 1.5-litre petrol engine paired with an IVT or a 1.4-litre turbocharged petrol engine paired with a 7-speed DCT. The former variant has a 7-seater configuration, while the latter variant has a 6-seater configuration with captain seats. In May 2023, the Premium trim equipped with the 1.5-litre petrol engine was made available as a 6-seater configuration with captain seats.

The facelifted model was launched in Indonesia at the 33rd Indonesia International Motor Show on 5 February 2026, following the changeover of local distributorship of Kia vehicles to Kia Sales Indonesia, a Kia Corporation subsidiary. It is available in three trim levels: Trendy, Motion, and Signature, all variants powered by the 1.5-litre petrol engine paired with an IVT. All trims are available with either 7-seater or 6-seater configurations. An unnamed base variant with a 6-speed manual transmission was introduced in July 2026.

The Carens EV and its rebadged model, the Hyundai Neira, was introduced on 29 July 2026. It is named after Banda Neira island in the province of Maluku. Sales commenced on 20 November. It was available in Essential, Style and Prime trims.

Bookings for the Indonesian market Carens EV commenced on 27 October 2026. It was available with two trim levels: Air and Earth. Both trims are available with either 7-seater or 6-seater configurations. Sales commenced on 10 November 2026.

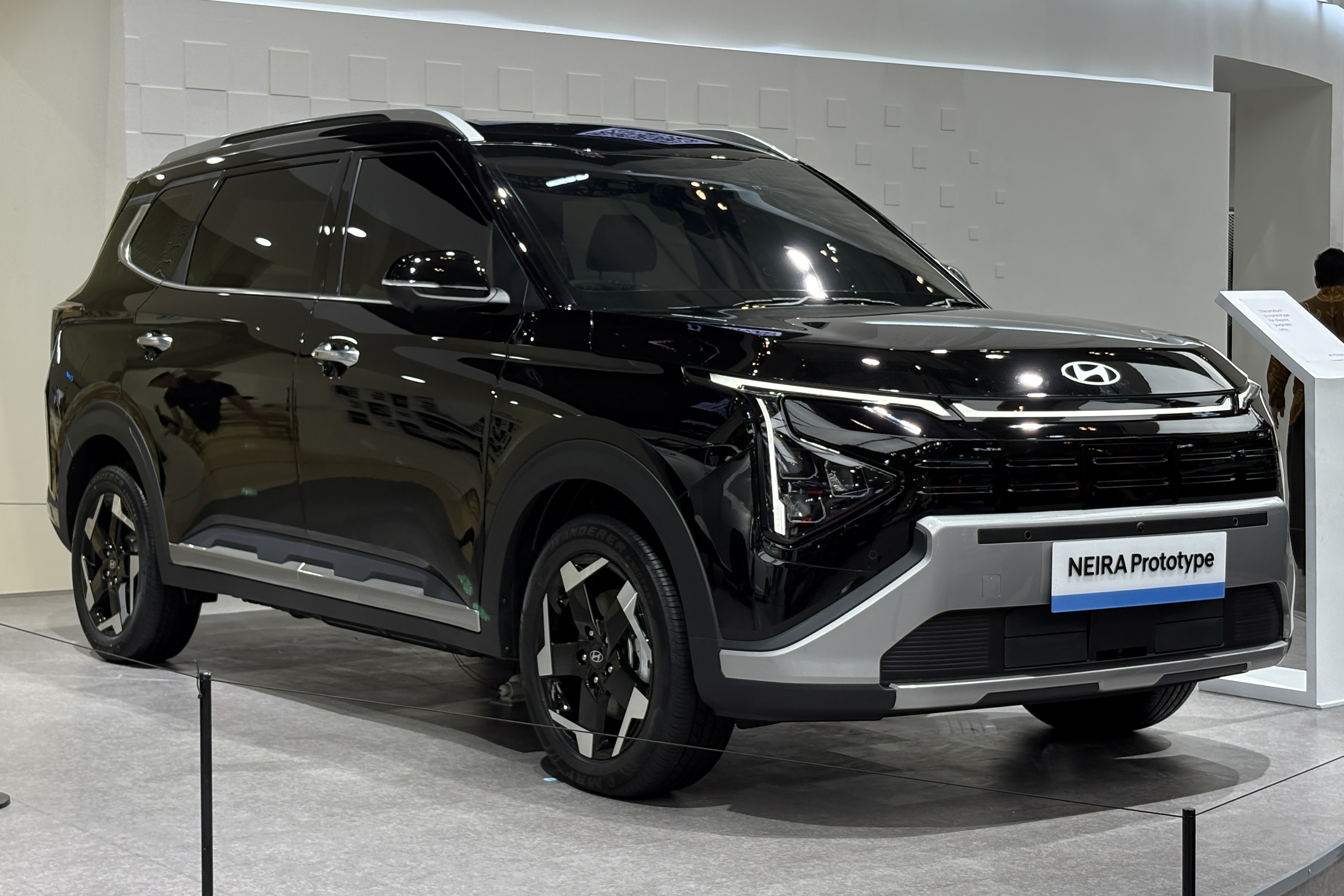
Hyundai Neira Prototype

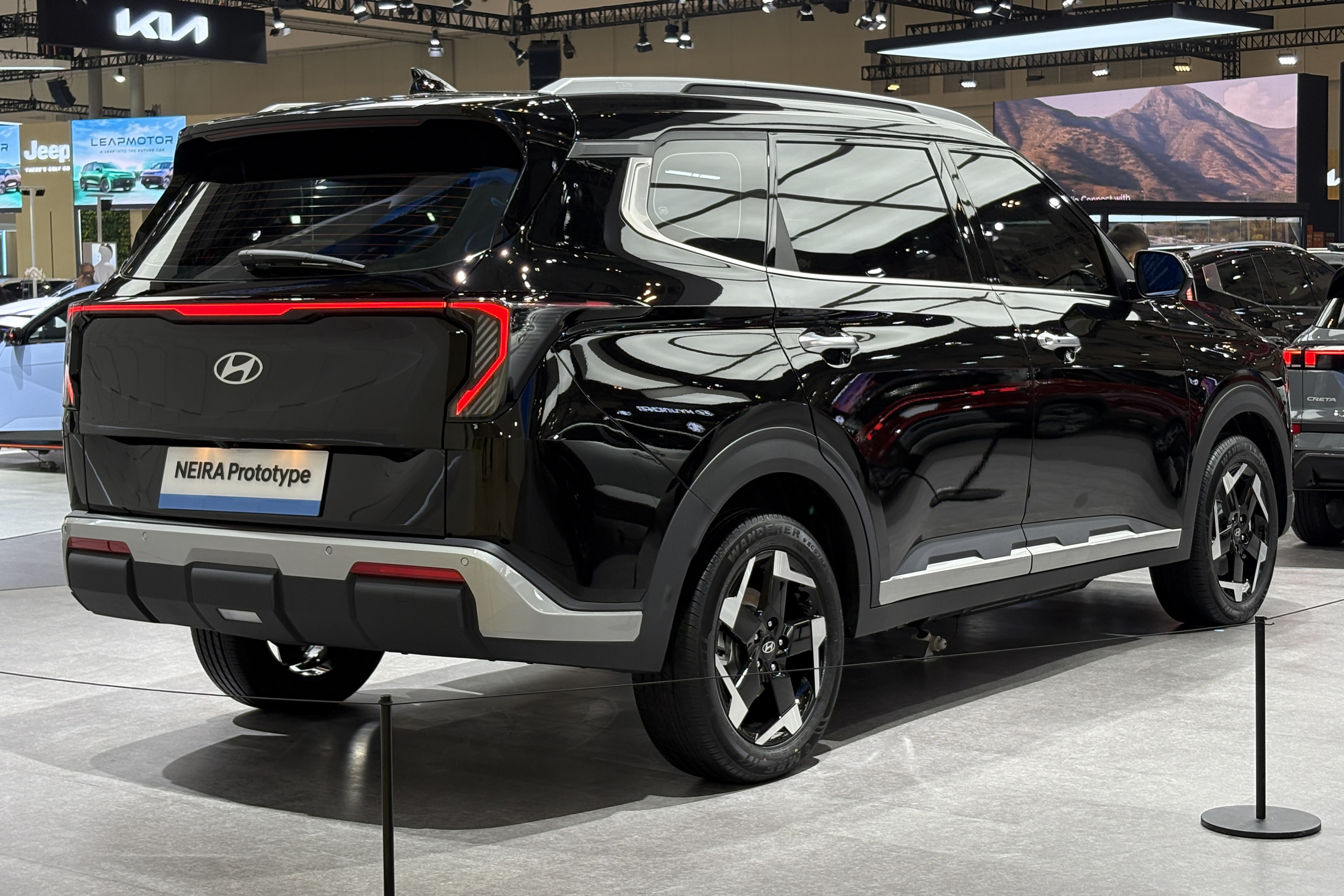
Rear view

==== South Africa ====
The fourth-generation Carens was launched in South Africa on 6 May 2026, with four trim levels: LS, LX, EX and SX, all variants powered by the 1.5-litre turbocharged diesel engine, paired with either a 6-speed manual or a 6-speed automatic.

==== Vietnam ====
The fourth-generation Carens was launched in Vietnam on 11 November 2022, with four trim levels: Deluxe (6-speed manual and IVT), Luxury (IVT), Premium (7-speed DCT or 6-speed automatic) and Signature (7-speed DCT or 6-speed automatic). The Vietnamese-market Carens is available with three engines: The 1.5-litre naturally aspirated petrol engine for the Deluxe and Luxury trims, the 1.4-litre turbocharged petrol engine, and the 1.5-litre turbocharged diesel engine, which is available on both Premium and Signature trims. The Carens is assembled locally at the THACO Kia manufacturing facility in Chu Lai Province for the Vietnamese market.

The facelifted model called the Carens Clavis was launched in Vietnam on 29 September 2026, with two variants: 1.5G Deluxe and 1.5G Luxury, both variants are powered by the 1.5-litre naturally aspirated petrol engine. Since the launch of Carens Clavis, the pre-facelift Carens is sold alongside the facelift model.

=== Powertrain ===
Carens (KY) engine options
Petrol engines
Model	Engine	Power	Torque	Transmissions
Smartstream G1.4 T-GDi	1,353 cc (82.6 cu in) turbocharged I4	140 PS (103 kW; 138 hp) @ 6,000 rpm	24.7 kg⋅m (242 N⋅m; 179 lb⋅ft) @ 1,500–3,200 rpm	6-speed manual 7-speed DCT
Smartstream G1.5 MPi	1,497 cc (91.4 cu in) I4	115 PS (85 kW; 113 hp) @ 6,300 rpm	14.7 kg⋅m (144 N⋅m; 106 lb⋅ft) @ 4,500 rpm	6-speed manual CVT
Smartstream G1.5 T-GDi	1,482 cc (90.4 cu in) turbocharged I4	160 PS (118 kW; 158 hp) @ 5,500 rpm	25.8 kg⋅m (253 N⋅m; 187 lb⋅ft) @ 1,500–3,500 rpm	6-speed manual 7-speed DCT
Diesel engine
Model	Engine	Power	Torque	Transmissions
1.5 L U II CRDi VGT	1,493 cc (91.1 cu in) turbocharged I4	115 PS (85 kW; 113 hp) @ 4,000 rpm	25.5 kg⋅m (250 N⋅m; 184 lb⋅ft) @ 1,500–2,750 rpm	6-speed manual 6-speed automatic

=== Safety ===
Global NCAP 1.0 test results (India) Kia Carens – 6 Airbags (H1 2022, similar to Latin NCAP 2013)
Test	Score	Stars
Adult occupant protection	9.30/17.00	3 /5 stars
Child occupant protection	30.99/49.00	3 /5 stars

The fourth-generation Carens for the Indian market is equipped as standard with two frontal airbags, two front-seat side body airbags, two head-protecting curtain airbags covering the first two rows, antilock brakes, Electronic Stability Control, hill-hold and a tyre pressure monitor.

Kia sponsored Global NCAP crashworthiness assessment for the Carens in March 2022 with results published in late June. The Carens was the last model to be assessed against the 2017-22 Global NCAP 1.0 protocols. In the frontal offset test, front occupant head and neck protection was good and airbag contact was stable. Dummy readings showed some limited chest compression and chest protection was further downrated to 'marginal' because the passenger compartment became unstable, load path failures indicating poor reproducibility of structural measurements. Pedal movement was high, which was the major reason for the low score.

Kia also sponsored a regulatory side impact test according to the ECE Regulation 95 protocols and the Carens passed, but this could not be used in the assessment because the Carens did not reach the minimum points in the frontal impact for a five star result.

Global NCAP 2.0 test results (India) Kia Carens (2024, similar to Latin NCAP 2016)
Test	Score	Stars
Adult occupant protection	0.00/34.00	0 /5 stars
Child occupant protection	40.92/49.00	4 /5 stars

In a bid to improve the Carens' star rating, Kia made changes to the structure of the Carens for Indian units produced from 2 May 2023, also adding three-point seatbelts to all seats and compatibility with i-Size child restraints. This updated version was retested by Global NCAP and assessed against updated evaluation criteria. In the first retest, the pedals still intruded excessively and the passenger compartment became unstable again. Moreover, the driver's airbag was still inflating as the dummy's head made contact, resulting in dummy values showing an unacceptably high risk of serious or fatal neck injury, enough for Global NCAP to immediately award the Carens zero stars based on this alone. Child occupants were better protected than earlier because Kia selected new child restraints facing backwards.

Global NCAP 2.0 test results (India) Kia Carens (2024, similar to Latin NCAP 2016)
Test	Score	Stars
Adult occupant protection	22.07/34.00	3 /5 stars
Child occupant protection	41.00/49.00	5 /5 stars

With unspecified changes to the restraint systems for units produced from 11 December 2023, dummy values in a subsequent retest indicated risk of serious or fatal neck injury, while other problems persisted. This version was awarded three stars for adult protection by Global NCAP.

== Sales ==
Year	South Korea	India	Europe	US	Canada	Vietnam	Indonesia
2000			1,523				661
2001			5,761				1,411
2002			7,498				900
2003			19,252				1,450
2004			16,139				1,596
2005			15,946				971
2006			14,489	594	85		787
2007			19,843	26,020	7,682		553
2008			15,482	28,645	9,905		6
2009			11,766	14,206	9,835		—N/a (Note: The Kia Carens was discontinued in the Indonesian market multiple times due to low sales performance before later being reintroduced by the manufacturer.)
2010			3,502	3,588	6,307		—N/a
2011			1,348	47	6,154		—N/a
2012			685		6,316		—N/a
2013			14,330		6,154		266
2014	4,090		22,307		5,432		150
2015	3,647		21,967		3,543		25
2016	3,245		20,381		1,963		—N/a
2017	2,805		19,192		1,178		—N/a
2018	1,712		19,382		135		—N/a
2019			844			1,033	—N/a
2020			1			324	—N/a
2022		62,756					174
2023							330
2024							234
2025							10
