= Hyundai Mu engine =

μ engine^{Mu engine}

Overview
- Manufacturer: Hyundai Motor Company
- Production: 2005–2014

Layout
- Configuration: V6
- Displacement: 2.7 L; 162.1 cu in (2,656 cc)
- Cylinder bore: 86.7 mm (3.41 in)
- Piston stroke: 75 mm (2.95 in)
- Cylinder block material: Aluminum
- Cylinder head material: Aluminum
- Valvetrain: DOHC 4 valves x 6 cyl.

RPM range
- Idle speed: 680

Combustion
- Fuel system: Multi-port fuel injection
- Fuel type: Gasoline; LPG
- Cooling system: Water-cooled

Output
- Power output: 161–200 PS (118–147 kW; 159–197 hp)
- Torque output: 25–26.5 kg⋅m (245–260 N⋅m; 181–192 lb⋅ft)

Chronology
- Predecessor: Delta

The Hyundai Mu engine is a variant of the 2.7-liter Delta, the main difference being the inclusion of continuous variable valve timing (CVVT).

== General information ==
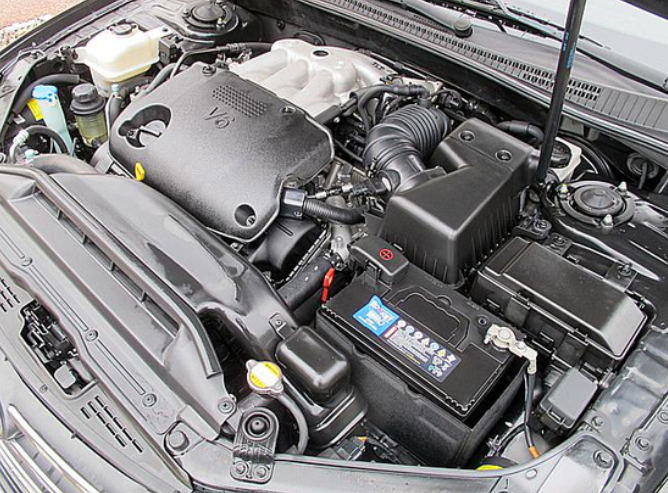
Hyundai Mu engine

The Mu V6 (G6EA) is based on the Delta series and adopted some innovations of the parallel developed Lambda series, which was released in 2004. This includes the CVVT, the changeover to mechanical bucket tappets and the almost identical cylinder head. The Mu is a 60 degree six cylinder and uses all aluminum block and heads. It features DOHC with 4 valves per cylinder, Variable intake system (VIS), Variable length intake runners (VLM) and Multi-Port Fuel Injection (MPi). The engines were built in Asan, Korea by Hyundai.

Compared to the predecessor Delta, the compression was increased slightly to 10.4, which led to an approximately three percent fuel saving (Compression ratio). In addition, the cylinder head was modified to add a CVVT named camshaft adjustment for the intake side which enabled it to produce 188 PS (138 kW; 185 hp) at 6,000 rpm and 25.2 kg⋅m (247 N⋅m; 182 lb⋅ft) of torque at 4,000 rpm. The Mu utilizes a timing belt to drive the exhaust cams on each bank of the engine, with the intake cam sprocket driven by a chain. The CVVT mechanism in the Mu varies intake cam timing relative to the exhaust cam timing, which is fixed. This did not vary the valve lift nor duration.

In 2008, the CVVT control was updated to include the exhaust cams as well (Dual-CVVT), which enabled it to produce 194 PS (143 kW; 191 hp) at 6,000 rpm and 25.4 kg⋅m (249 N⋅m; 184 lb⋅ft) of torque at 4,500 rpm, the Kia Cadenza from 2010 to 2013 utilized this variant with unpublished changes to produce 200 PS (147 kW; 197 hp) at 6,000 rpm and 25.4 kg⋅m (249 N⋅m; 184 lb⋅ft) of torque at 4,500 rpm.

A version for LPG, (codenamed L6EA) was made for the Korean market, utilizing a compression ratio of 10.0, it produced 164 PS (121 kW; 162 hp) at 5,200 rpm and 25 kg⋅m (245 N⋅m; 181 lb⋅ft) of torque at 4,000 rpm.

== Specifications ==
Engine Code	Valve timing	Displacement (cm^{3})	Stroke × Bore (mm)	Power (rpm)	Torque (rpm)	Compression	Intake Technology	Fuel Delivery
Petrol
G6EA	CVVT	2656	75.0 × 86.7	188 PS (138 kW; 185 hp) @ 6,000 rpm	25.5 kg⋅m (250 N⋅m; 184 lb⋅ft) @ 4,000 rpm	10.4:1	Variable Intake System (VIS)	Multipoint Fuel Injection (MPi)
G6EA	D-CVVT	2656	75.0 × 86.7	194 PS (143 kW; 191 hp) @ 6,000 rpm 200 PS (147 kW; 197 hp) @ 6,000 rpm	25.5 kg⋅m (250 N⋅m; 184 lb⋅ft) @ 4,000 rpm 26 kg⋅m (255 N⋅m; 188 lb⋅ft) @ 4,000 rpm	10.4:1	Variable Intake System (VIS)	Multipoint Fuel Injection (MPi)
LPG
L6EA	CVVT	2656	75.0 × 86.7	161–165 PS (118–121 kW; 159–163 hp) @ 5,400 rpm	25 kg⋅m (245 N⋅m; 181 lb⋅ft) @ 4,000 rpm	10.0:1	Variable Intake System (VIS)	Multipoint Fuel Injection (MPi)

== Applications ==
=== Petrol ===
- Hyundai Grandeur/Azera (TG) (2005–2011)
- Hyundai Santa Fe (CM) (2005–2010)
- Kia Cadenza/K7 (VG) (2009–2011)
- Kia Carnival/Sedona (VQ) (2006–2010)
- Kia Opirus (2007–2012)
- Kia Optima (MG) (2005–2010)
- Kia Rondo (UN) (2006–2013)

=== LPG ===
- Kia K7 (VG) (2009–2011)
- Kia Carnival (VQ) (2005–2011)
- Kia Opirus (2010–2012)
- Kia Sorento (XM) (2009–2010)

== See also ==
- List of Hyundai engines
