= Oullim Spirra =

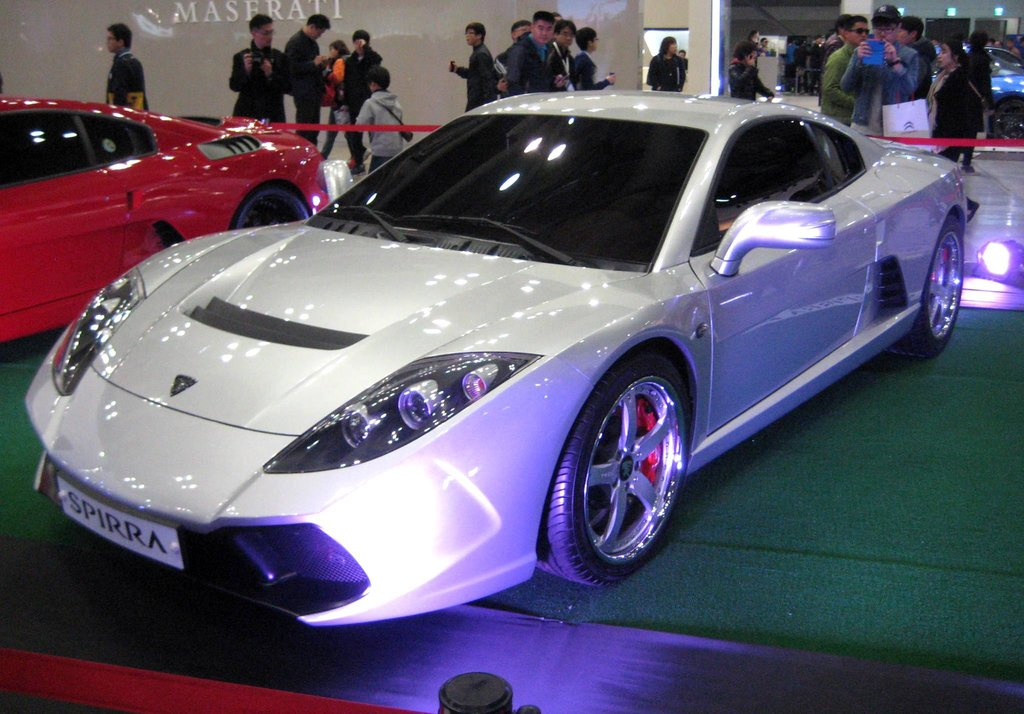
- Spirra EX

Overview
- Manufacturer: Oullim Motors Inc.
- Production: 2008–2017
- Assembly: Gyeonggi Province, South Korea

Body and chassis
- Class: Sports car
- Body style: 2-door coupe
- Layout: RMR layout

Powertrain
- Engine: 2.7L Delta V6 Turbo; 3.8L RS3800 V6 Turbo
- Transmission: 6-speed manual

Dimensions
- Wheelbase: 2,660 mm (104.7 in)
- Length: 4,357 mm (171.5 in)
- Width: 1,924 mm (75.7 in)
- Height: 1,216 mm (47.9 in)
- Curb weight: 1,320–1,400 kg (2,910–3,086 lb)

The Oullim Spirra is a sports car manufactured by Oullim Motors, a subsidiary of Oullim Networks. The company headquarters are located in Yangjae-dong in Gangnam of Seoul while the production facility is located in Gyeonggi Province just south of Seoul. Oullim Motors was co-founded in 2007 by former Ssangyong Motors designer Han-chul Kim and Dong-hyuk Park, the founder and CEO of Oullim Networks.

The Spirra had been in production from 2008 to 2017, and was available in various countries including China, United Arab Emirates, Malaysia and the Netherlands.

== Introduction ==
The initial conception of a Korean exotic sports car was envisioned by Han-chul Kim in the mid 1990s, then a designer at SsangYong Motors. Upon the inception of a tangible vision, Kim quit Ssangyong Motors to further pursue the dream of building a sports car and founded Proto Motors with his wife, a researcher at Asia Motors.

The original mid-engine, rear-wheel-drive design featured a Ford-derived V8 engine with an output of 320 hp (239 kW). This engine was from the 1999/2001 Ford Mustang SVT Cobra. With the engine the Spirra has a claimed 0-62 mph (100 km/h) time under 4.0 seconds with an expected top speed of 180 mph (290 km/h). A prototype, developed to compete as a competent sports car, was codenamed the PS-II and revealed to the public for the first time at the 2000 Seoul Motor Show. The PS-II was renamed the Spirra before being debuted at the 2004 Beijing Motor Show. Initial production attempts failed due to insufficient funds and the project was delayed indefinitely.

The production of the Spirra became feasible when Kim coincidentally met Dong-hyuk Park, an ardent car enthusiast and successful IT entrepreneur. Park had established Oullim Networks Inc, a firm specializing in internet securities. He also founded Oullim Motors, a subsidiary of the Oullim conglomerate concentrating on the development, design and innovation of motor vehicles. In 2007, Proto Motors was acquired by Oullim Motors with Kim as chief of development, and under new management the Spirra project was rejuvenated after five years of stagnation.

== Production models ==
The Spirra lineup consisted of four different trims under the names Spirra N, Spirra S, Spirra Turbo and Spirra EX. All engines before CregiT are based on the DOHC 2656 cc V6 Delta engine. These engines undergo extensive calibrations and modifications for increased performance, power and responsiveness suitable for applications requiring such characteristics. All of Spirra CregiT used DOHC 3778 cc V6 Lambda RS engine. Depending on market location, the price varies between $74,000 and $175,000 [U.S Dollars].

=== Electric Spirra ===
An all-electric variant of the Spirra was in development, similar to the likes of the Tesla Roadster. Relying primarily on electricity, the vehicle was co-developed by a Dutch company known as Electric Power Holland; they were also the sole dealer of Spirras in the European Union and subsequently had exclusive rights to develop the car. Specifications for the Spirra E were not available, but unverified sources claimed a top speed of 125 mph [201 km/h], a 0-62 mph time of 5.3 seconds, and a maximum cruising range of 120 miles [200 km]

=== Specifications ===
Specifications of the Spirra (Iconic, N, S, T, EX Models) is presented in the following table:

Specification	Spirra EX	Spirra T	Spirra S	Spirra N	Spirra Iconic	Spirra CregiT N	Spirra CregiT Turbo	Spirra CregiT EX
0–100 km/h(62 mph)	3.5s	3.8s	4.6s	6.8s	4.6s	4.4s	4.0s	3.5s
Top speed	315 km/h (196 mph)	305 km/h (190 mph)	290 km/h (180 mph)	220 km/h (137 mph)	290 km/h (180 mph)	240 km/h (149 mph)	305 km/h (190 mph)	320 km/h (199 mph)
Curb weight(dry)	1,320 kg (2,910 lb)	1,320 kg (2,910 lb)	1,320 kg (2,910 lb)	1,320 kg (2,910 lb)	1,320 kg (2,910 lb)	N.A	N.A	N.A
Max. power (SAE net)	500 hp (507 PS; 373 kW)	420 hp (426 PS; 313 kW)	380 hp (385 PS; 283 kW)	175 hp (177 PS; 130 kW)	380 hp (385 PS; 283 kW)	305 hp (309 PS; 227 kW)	470 hp (477 PS; 350 kW)	600 hp (608 PS; 447 kW)
Max. torque	55 kg⋅m (539 N⋅m; 398 lb⋅ft)	50 kg⋅m (490 N⋅m; 362 lb⋅ft)	48 kg⋅m (471 N⋅m; 347 lb⋅ft)	25 kg⋅m (245 N⋅m; 181 lb⋅ft)	48 kg⋅m (471 N⋅m; 347 lb⋅ft)	41 kg⋅m (402 N⋅m; 297 lb⋅ft)	60 kg⋅m (588 N⋅m; 434 lb⋅ft)	81 kg⋅m (794 N⋅m; 586 lb⋅ft)

== Racing ==
The racing version of the Spirra was designed to compete in the KGTM tour. The V6 2.7 24V Twin Turbo engine has been further tweaked to produce 600 hp (450 kW) and reach 338 km/h (211 mph). The team won its debut race at Yongin Speedway in the 2008 Extra Time Trial and took 1st place in the 2008 series. Competent race cars such as the BMW M3 GTR, Porsche GT3 RSR and Nismo 350Z were participants in the KGTM tour.

== See also ==
- Hyundai Genesis Coupe
- Hyundai Genesis
