= Proto Motors =

South Korean automobile manufacturer

- Native name: 프로토자동차
- Founded: 1997-2017(defunct) 2023-Present
- Headquarters: South Korea
- Products: sports cars

Proto Motors (Korean: 프로토자동차) was a South Korean sports car manufacturer and coachbuilder.

== History ==
Proto Motors was established in 1997 by the couple Han-chul Kim and Ji-sun Choi. The company has forged partnerships with Hyundai Motor Company, Kia Motors, and GM Daewoo. In 2001, the company custom-made a convertible limousine for Cheongwadae (the Equus), the South Korean presidential residence.

Proto Motors introduced the Spirra (a production model of PS-ll) at the 4th Seoul Motor Show. In 2006, Proto Motors was acquired by Oullim Motors and the development of the Spirra was continued, and in 2010 Proto Motors introduced the first Korea-made supercar. In 2014, the Oullim Motors Spirra EV, the electric version of the Spirra, was introduced.

Previously, the company specialized in redesigning existing models by developing electric cars or convertibles based on them. The company closed in 2017.

== Models ==
- RT-X (1998)
- PS-II (2000)
- Spirra (2007–2017)
- Kia Grand Carnival Limousine (2006–2017)
- SC24 (2024–Present)

== See also ==
- List of Korean car makers
