= Sedona (disambiguation) =

Sedona is a city in Arizona, U.S.

Sedona may also refer to:

== People ==
- Sedona Prince (born 2000), American basketblal player
- Sedona Schnebly (1877–1950), American pioneer

== Other uses ==
- 157064 Sedona, a minor planet
- Apache Sedona, open-source geospatial data software
- Kia Sedona, car model
- Sedona (company), Turkish bicycle manufacturer
- Sedona (film), 2011 American comedy-drama film
- Sedona Hotel, Yangon, hotel in Yangon, Myanmar
- Sedona (song), song by Houndmouth from the 2015 album Little Neon Limelight
