= Sedona (company) =

Bicycle company

Sedona (Aslı Bisiklet)
- Type: Public
- Industry: Bicycle Manufacturing
- Founded: 1981
- Headquarters: Istanbul, Turkey
- Key people: Sacit Emanet (President)
- Products: Bicycles and Related Components
- Website: www.sedonabisiklet.com

Sedona is a Turkish bicycle manufacturer that produces many types of bike known for its road, racing, mountain bikes and single speed bikes. The company was founded 1981 in Istanbul as Aslı Bisiklet and then in 2005, first Sedona brand produced.
