= Kia Carnival =

- Kia Carnival (KA4, facelift)

Overview
- Manufacturer: Kia
- Also called: Kia Sedona (1999–2021)
- Production: 1998–present
- Model years: 1999–present

Body and chassis
- Class: Minivan
- Body style: 5-door minivan
- Layout: Front-engine, front-wheel-drive

The Kia Carnival (Korean: 기아 카니발) is a minivan manufactured by the South Korean automaker Kia since 1998, formerly marketed as the Kia Sedona in North America and several other markets.

The first-generation Carnival was introduced in January 1998, and was marketed in a single, short- wheelbase version. Second-generation models were marketed (2006–2014) in short and long wheelbase variants. A rebadged variant of the second generation was offered in North America as the Hyundai Entourage (2007–2009). Beginning in 2010, the second-generation model received updated equipment, including Kia's corporate Tiger Nose grille, as introduced by its then-new design chief, Peter Schreyer. Kia introduced its third-generation minivan in 2014, solely in a long-wheelbase format.

The fourth-generation model was introduced in 2020, and Kia adopted the "Carnival" name in North America for the 2022 model year.

== First generation (KV-II; 1998) ==
First generation
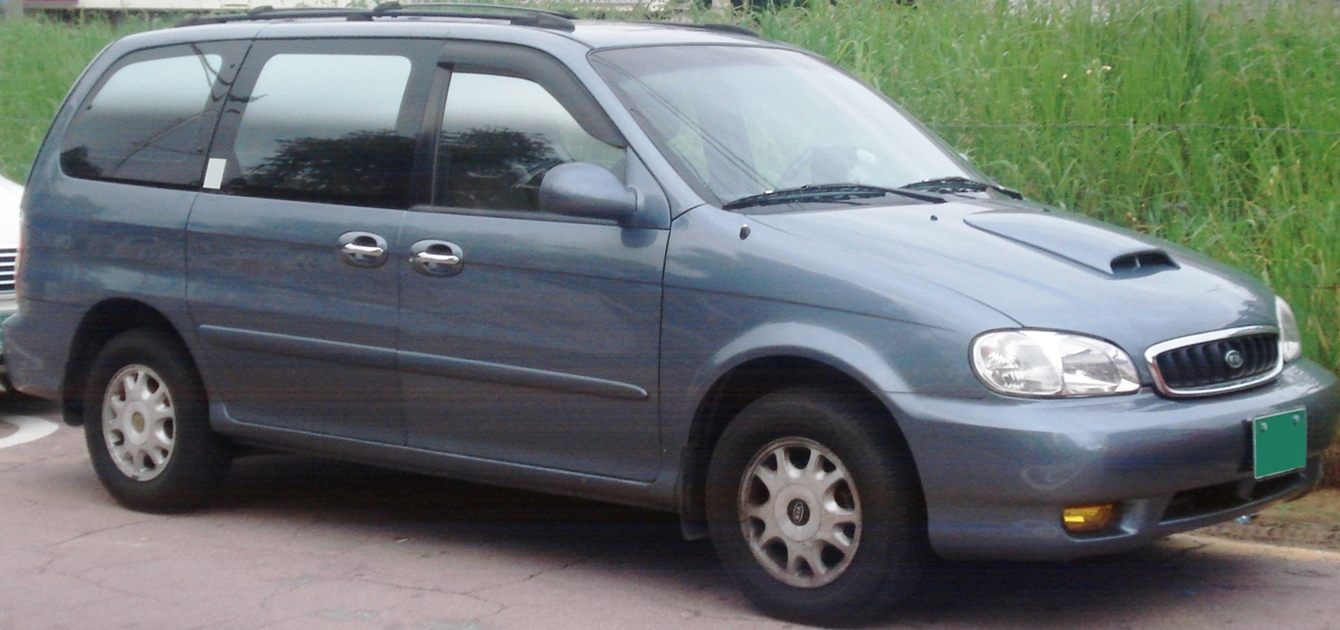
- Kia Carnival (pre-facelift, South Korea)

Overview
- Model code: KV-II
- Also called: Kia Sedona; Naza Ria (Malaysia)
- Production: January 1998–2005
- Model years: 2002–2005 (North America)
- Assembly: South Korea: Gwangmyeong (Sohari Plant); China: Yancheng (Yancheng Plant); Malaysia: Gurun (Naza); Pekan (AMM); Russia: Kaliningrad (Avtotor); Thailand: Lat Krabang (YMC)

Body and chassis
- Related: Kia Credos/Clarus

Powertrain
- Engine: Petrol: 2.5 L Rover KV6 V6; 3.5 L Sigma V6; Diesel: 2.9 L J-Line CRDi I4
- Transmission: 4-speed automatic; 5-speed automatic; 5-speed manual

Dimensions
- Wheelbase: 2,910 mm (114.6 in)
- Length: 4,890 mm (192.5 in) (1998–2000); 4,930 mm (194.1 in) (2000–2005)
- Width: 1,895 mm (74.6 in)
- Height: 1,730 mm (68.1 in) (1998–2001); 1,770 mm (69.7 in) (2001–2005)

The first generation model was manufactured and marketed differently for specific regions, including under a joint venture in the Chinese market with Dongfeng Yueda Kia, as well as the Naza Ria in Malaysia.

In Indonesia and the Philippines, both Carnival/Sedona names were used. Initially introduced as the Carnival in 2001, from 2003 onwards, it was renamed as the Sedona.

=== Markets ===
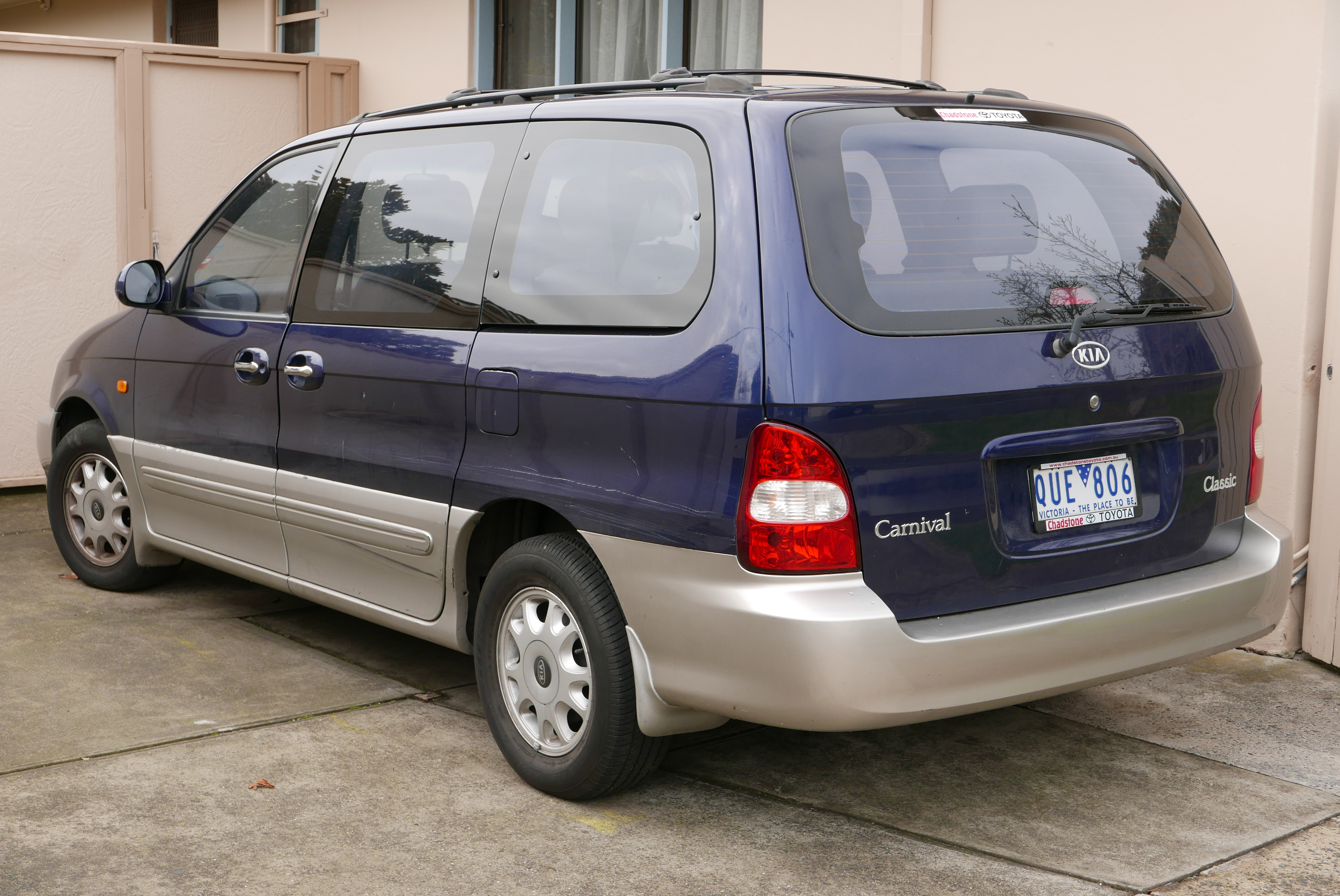
2001 Kia Carnival Classic (pre-facelift, Australia)

==== Australia ====
In Australia, the Kia Carnival went on sale in 1999, with a standard 5-speed manual and 2.5 L V6 producing 132 kW (179 PS; 177 hp). A 4-speed automatic was optional. In 2001, it outsold the Toyota Tarago, becoming the top-selling minivan in the country. It was a sales leader again in 2004 and 2005 when sales peaked at 5,259 units.

==== Europe ====
In Europe, the first generation was available only with Rover's 2.5 L KV6 engine 24V petrol with 163 PS (120 kW; 161 hp) and Euro 2 standard emission level and the 2.9 L turbo-diesel engine with 126 PS (93 kW; 124 hp). From 2001, Kia Motors introduced the 2.5 L KV6 Euro 3 with 150 PS (110 kW; 148 hp) and the 2.9 L CRDi common rail diesel engine with 144 PS.

==== North America ====
In North America, the Sedona came equipped with a 3.5 L Hyundai V6 engine making 195 hp (145 kW; 198 PS) and a 4-speed (later 5-speed) automatic transmission. Imported from South Korea, the first generation Sedona was little more than a nameplate-engineered Carnival II model and was offered only in an SWB format. As such, it didn’t offer equipment that many of its competitors had introduced, such as power sliding doors and liftgate, fold flat third row seating, navigation system, rear-view camera, or backup/parking sensors. Early Sedonas were rated at 15.6 L/100 km (15.1 mpg) (city) and 10.9 L/100 km (21.6 mpg) (highway), but the numbers improved slightly to 14.8 L/100 km (15.9 mpg) (city) and 9.6 L/100 km (24.5 mpg) (highway) for 2005 models.

In North America, the EX was the highest-level body style, offering cosmetic amenities like interior and exterior chrome accents, interior wood grain, leather wrapped steering wheel and gear shift knob, alloy wheels, optional leather appointed seating, sunroof and DVD player.

=== Facelift ===
The facelift model was first released in South Korea on 11 February 2001 as the Carnival II. In most markets, this model retained the Carnival name, while North American and some Asian markets renamed this model as the Sedona, which has been used in the United Kingdom since the pre-facelift model in September 1999. Left-hand drive models received a redesigned dashboard and door trim, while the right-hand drive models retained the previous dashboard and door trim design from the pre-facelift model.

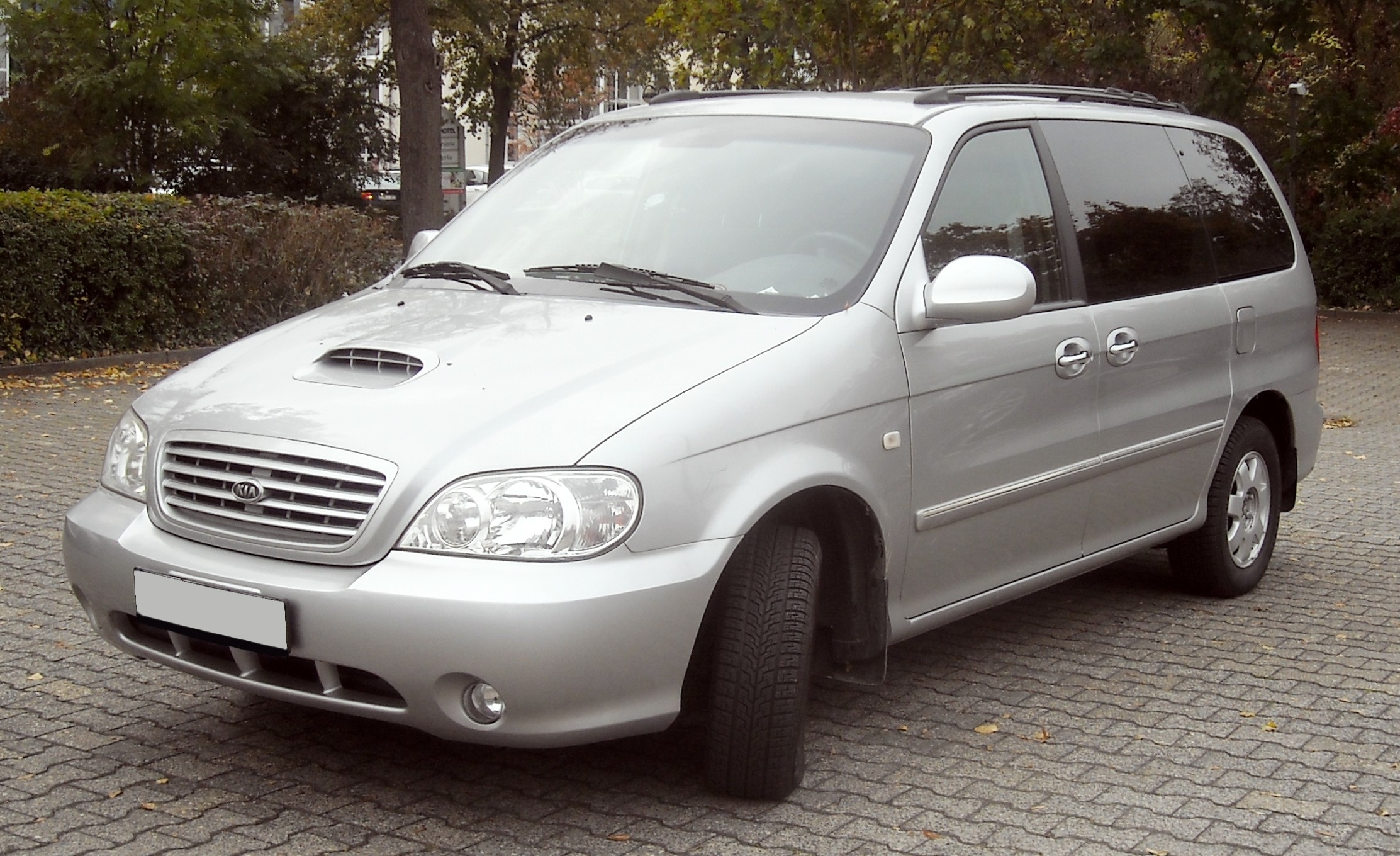
First facelift

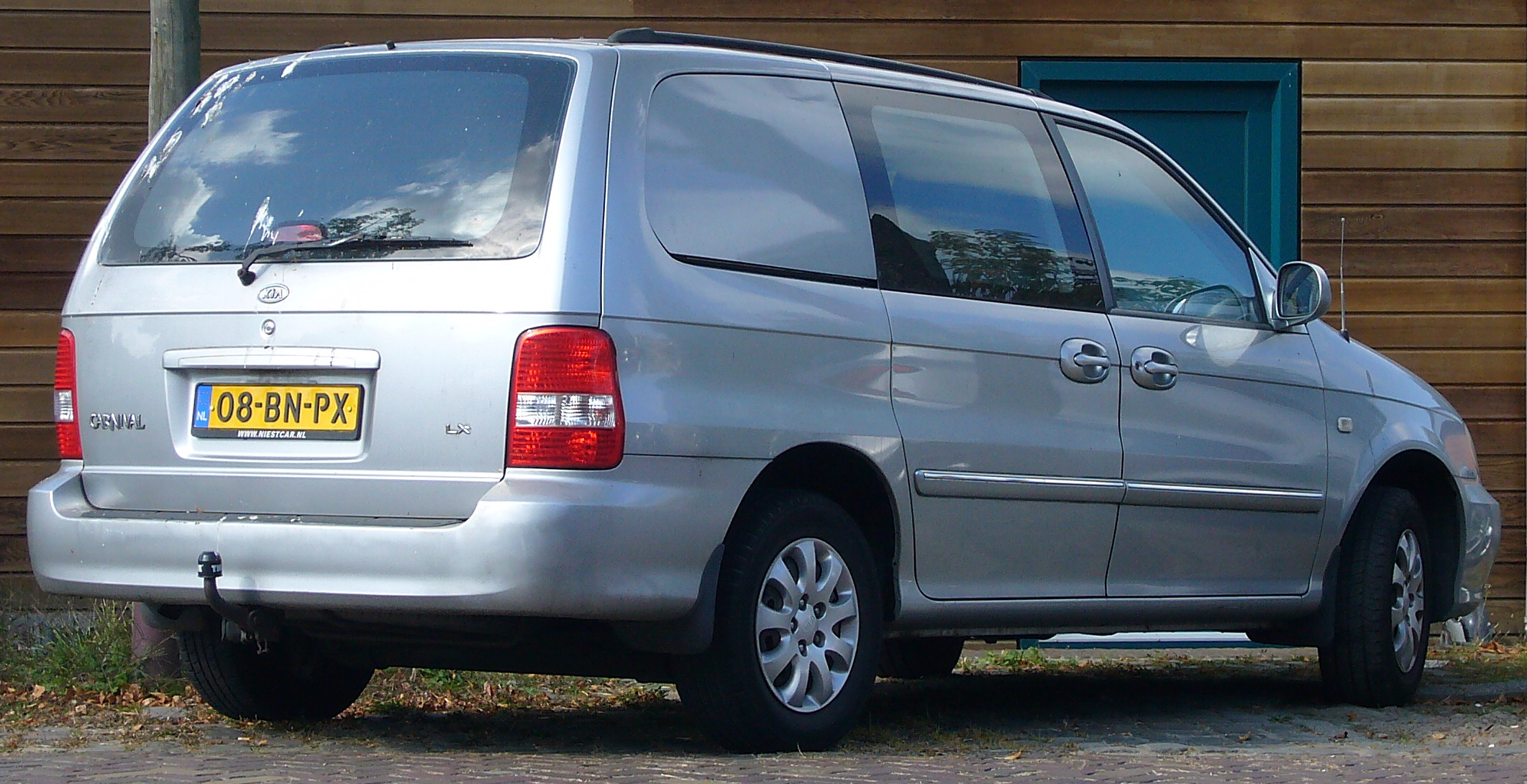
First facelift

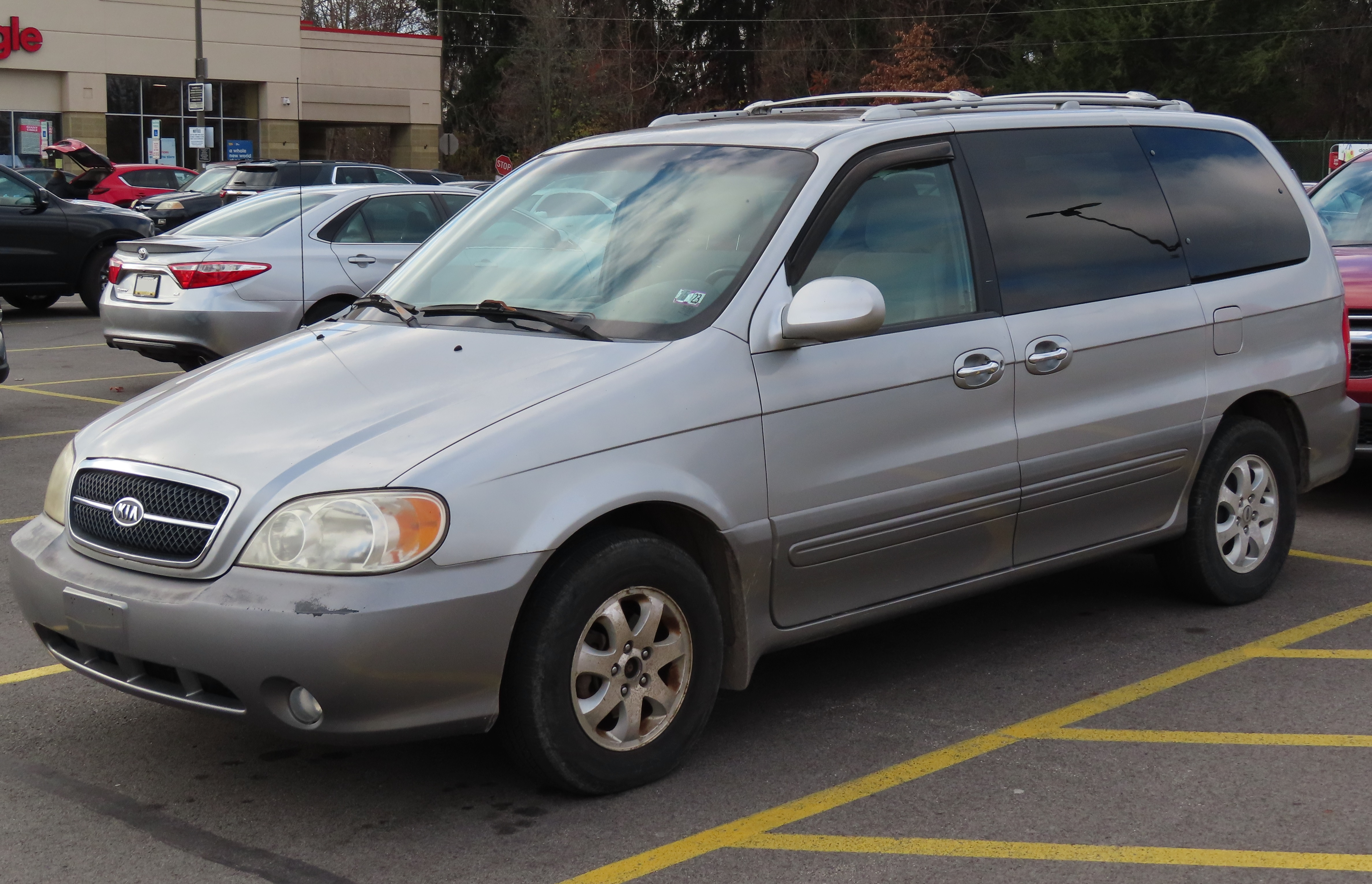
Kia Sedona EX (second facelift, US)

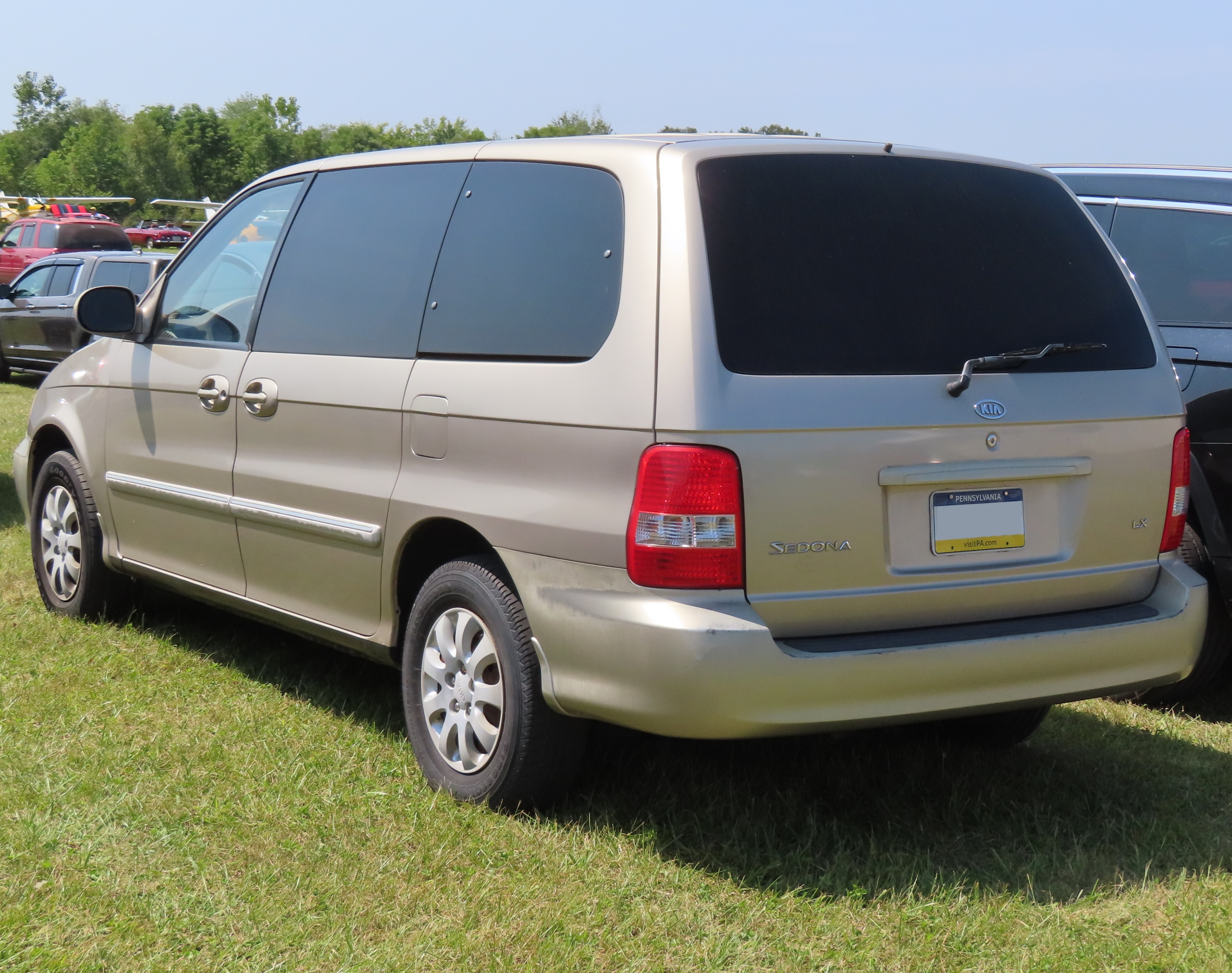
Kia Sedona LX (second facelift, US)

=== Naza Ria ===
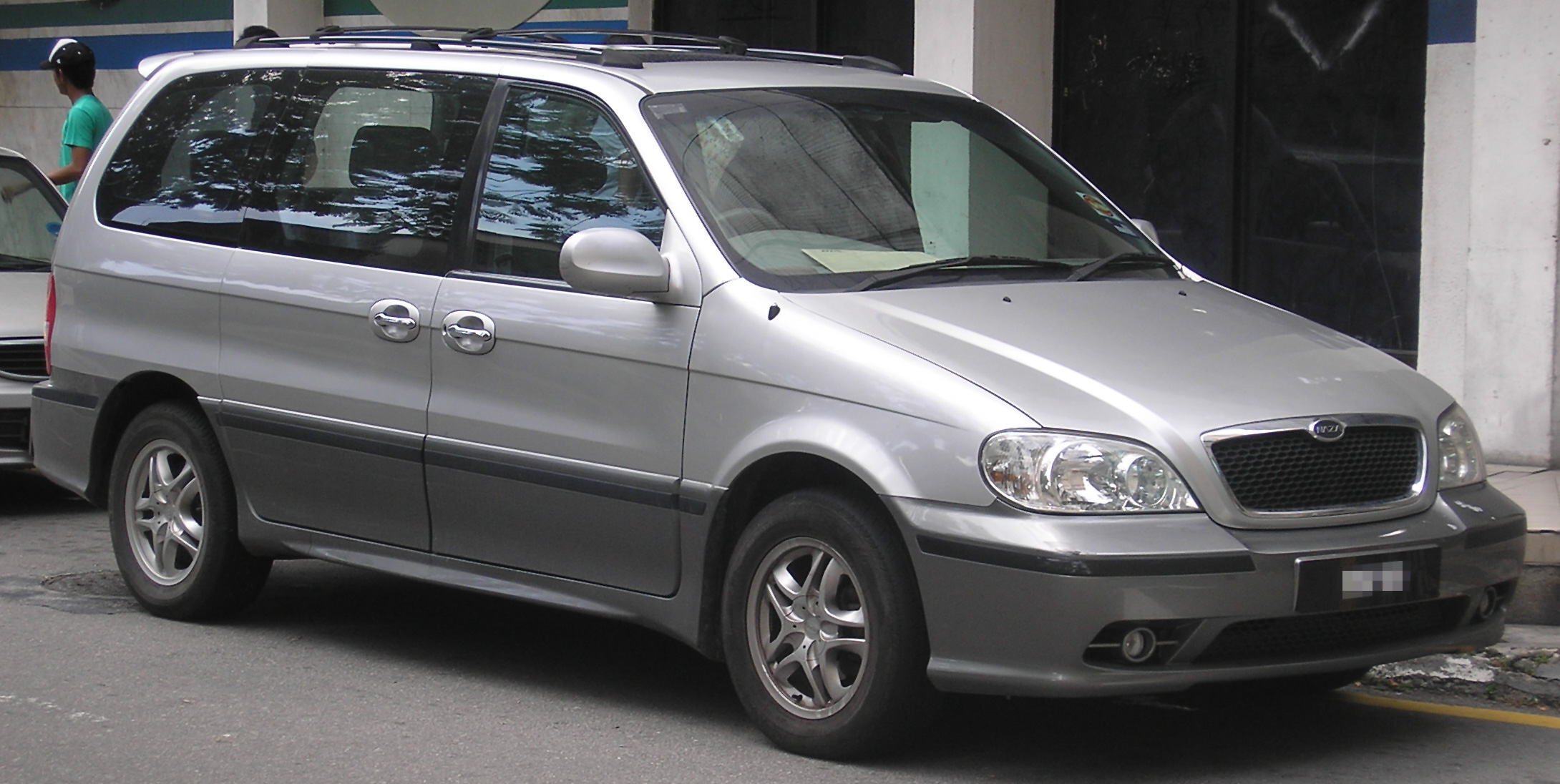
Naza Ria (Malaysia)

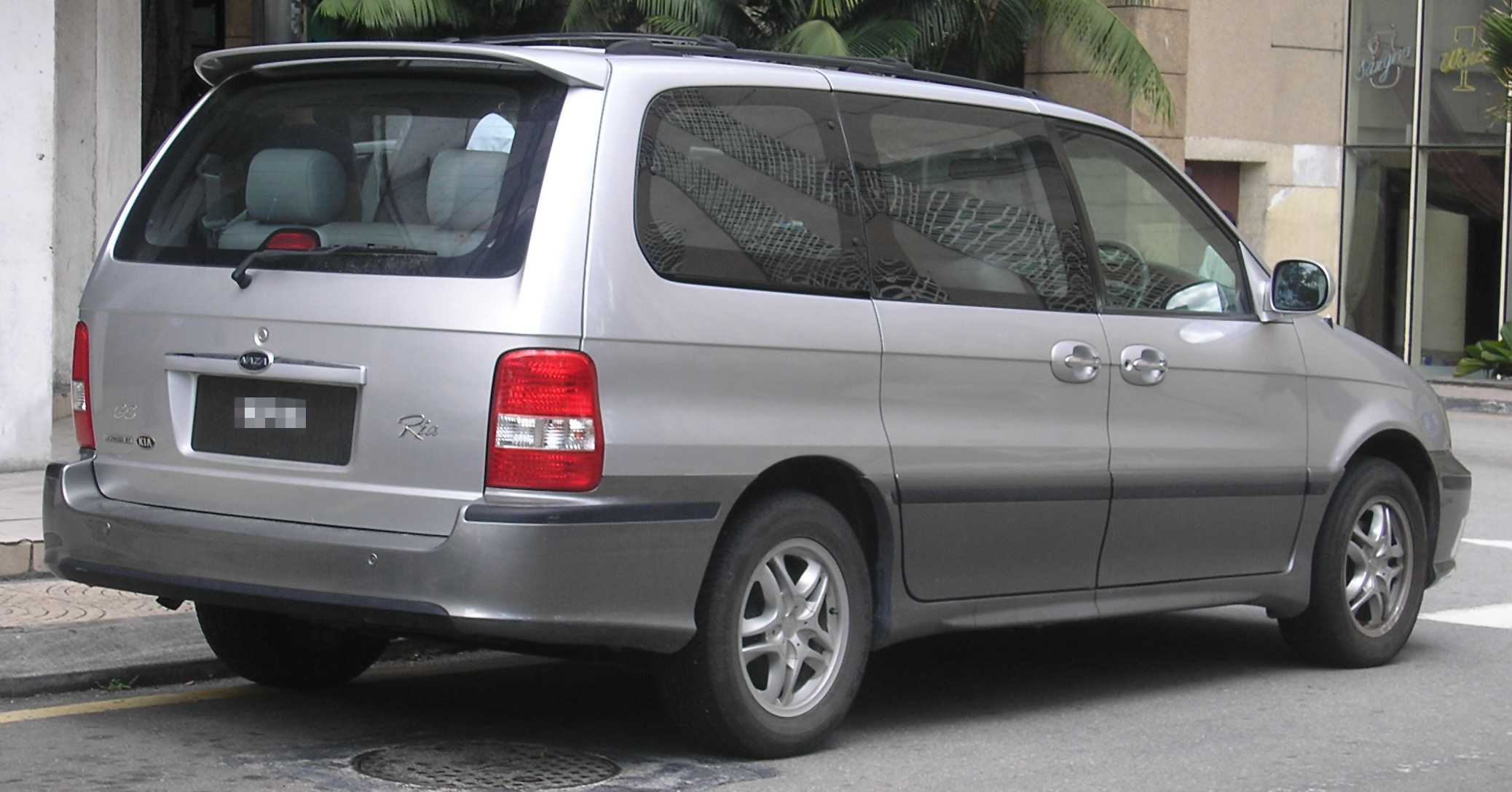
Naza Ria (Malaysia)

== Second generation (VQ; 2005) ==
Second generation
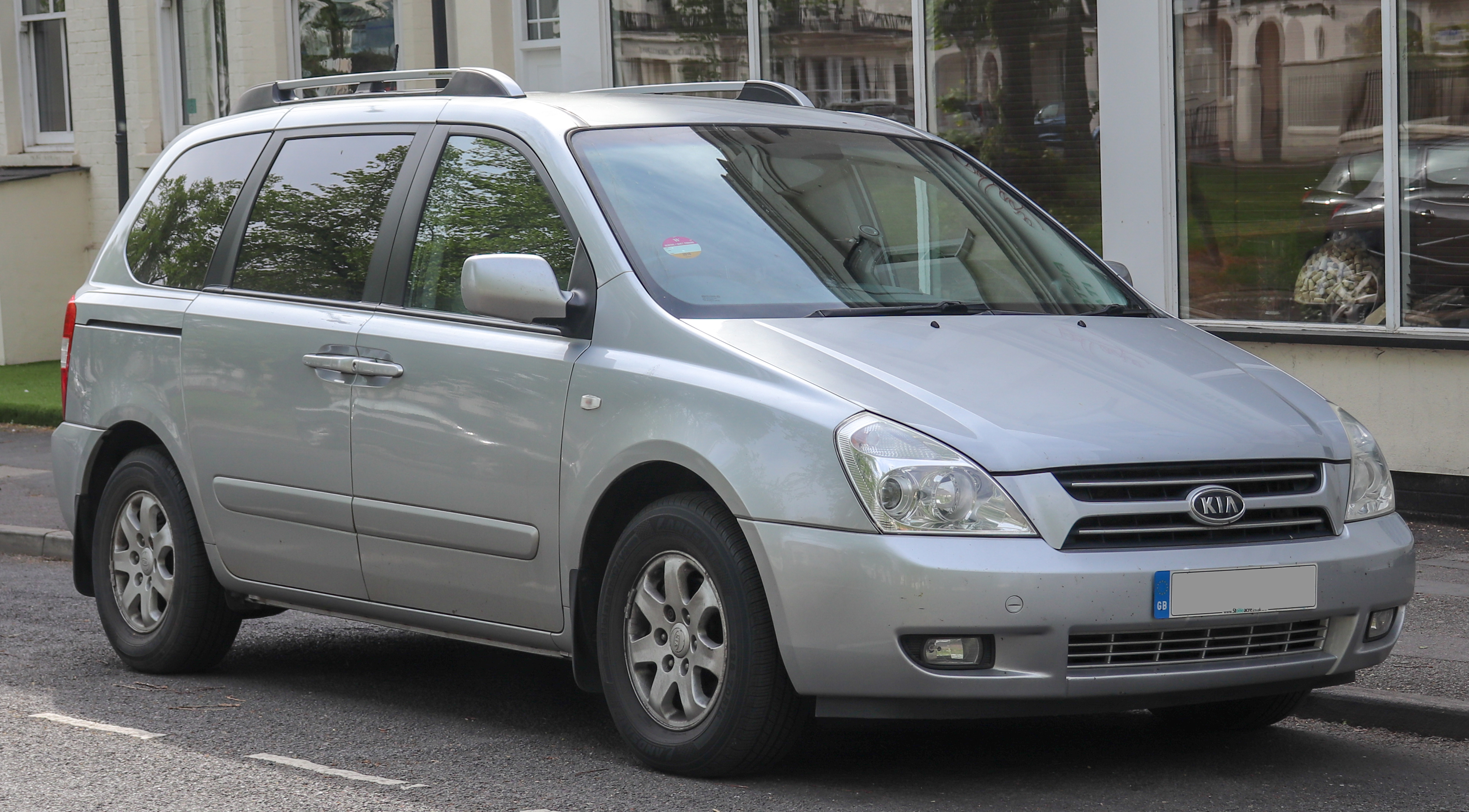
- 2007 Kia Sedona LS (pre-facelift, UK)

Overview
- Model code: VQ
- Also called: Kia Grand Carnival (LWB); Kia Sedona; Kia VQ (China); Hyundai Entourage (2006–2009)
- Production: December 2004–2014 (North America); June 2006–2012 (Europe)
- Model years: 2006–2012, 2014 (North America)
- Assembly: South Korea: Gwangmyeong (Sohari Plant); Russia: Kaliningrad (Avtotor); Thailand: Chachoengsao (Yontrakit Kia)

Body and chassis
- Platform: Hyundai-Kia Y5 platform
- Related: Hyundai Veracruz; Hyundai Santa Fe; Hyundai Sonata; Hyundai Grandeur/Azera; Kia Optima

Powertrain
- Engine: Petrol: 2.7 L Mu V6; 3.5 L Lambda II V6; 3.8 L Lambda V6; LPG: 2.7 L Mu LPi V6; Diesel: 2.2 L R II CRDi VGT I4; 2.9 L CRDi VGT I4
- Transmission: 5-speed manual; 6-speed manual; 4-speed automatic; 5-speed automatic; 6-speed automatic

Dimensions
- Wheelbase: 2,890 mm (113.8 in) (SWB); 3,020 mm (118.9 in) (LWB)
- Length: 4,810 mm (189.4 in) (SWB); 5,130–5,145 mm (202.0–202.6 in) (LWB)
- Width: 1,985 mm (78.1 in)
- Height: 1,760–1,780 mm (69.3–70.1 in)

Kia introduced the second generation Carnival/Sedona worldwide in 2005–in short (SWB) and long-wheelbase (LWB) models – with a 2-inch-wider front track, 3-inch-wider rear track and reduced turning radius than the first generation. The SWB model shares its platform with the Kia Magentis – and was specially designed for the European market, where it falls in the large MPV class.

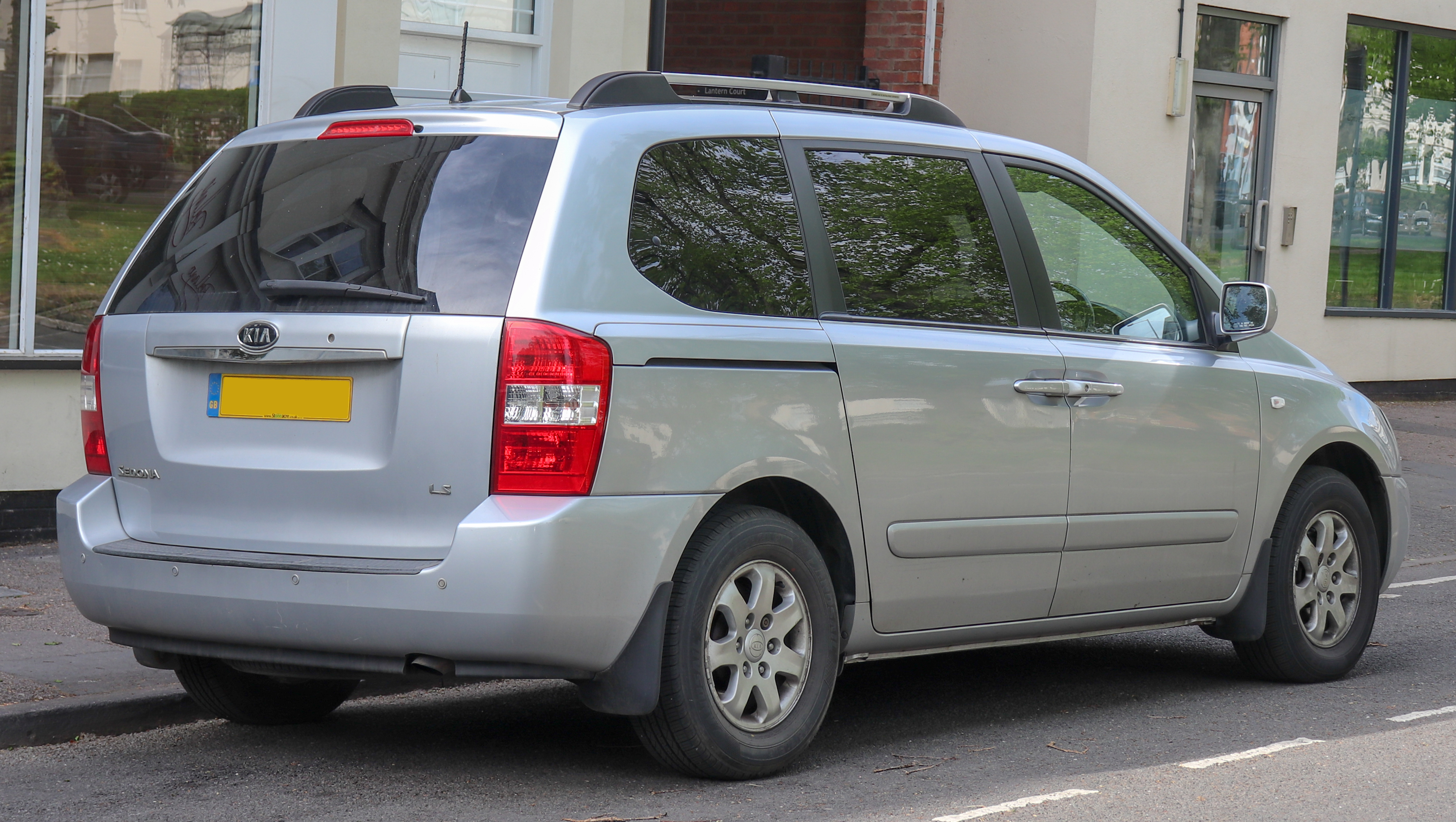
2007 Kia Sedona LS (pre-facelift, UK)

With a lighter engine, greater use of high-tensile steel in the body, and a lighter transmission and rear suspension, the second generation model weighed approximately 400 lbs less than the first generation.

In certain markets, Kia offered the minivan in both wheelbases (e.g., in North America, Australia) or in other markets, simply as the short-wheelbase configuration (e.g., UK, France). Globally, the minivan was offered with four engines as well as manual and automatic transmissions.

Equipment content varied widely by market–including such features as six airbags (front, front side and air curtain), Anti-lock braking system (ABS) with Electronic Brakeforce Distribution (EBD), Electronic Stability Control (ESC) with Traction Control System (TCS) & Brake Assist System (BAS), dual or tri-zone heating and cooling, "walk through" aisle between the front seats with fold-down tray, tilt/height adjustable steering wheel, Isofix anchor points, rear side sliding doors with "hold open" locking feature (to prevent an open door from inadvertently closing), second row power roll-down windows, third row 60/40-fold-in-floor seat (LWB only), power sliding doors and liftgate, backup sensors, and in-dash navigation.

In European and Asian markets, the SWB models offered a full range of options and available equipment, with a 2+3+2 seating configuration (an essential format in a large MPV for Europe). By contrast, in North America the SWB model was offered only in a base equipment level, with the 2+3+2 seating configuration and high-end options exclusive to LWB models.

=== Markets ===
==== United States ====
Kia introduced the second-generation Sedona to the North American market at the Chicago Auto Show in February 2005 for the 2006 model year offering a single engine/transmission choice, the 240 hp (179 kW; 243 PS) 3.8-litre V6 Hyundai Lambda engine with continuously variable intake valve timing and a five-speed manumatic automatic transmission.

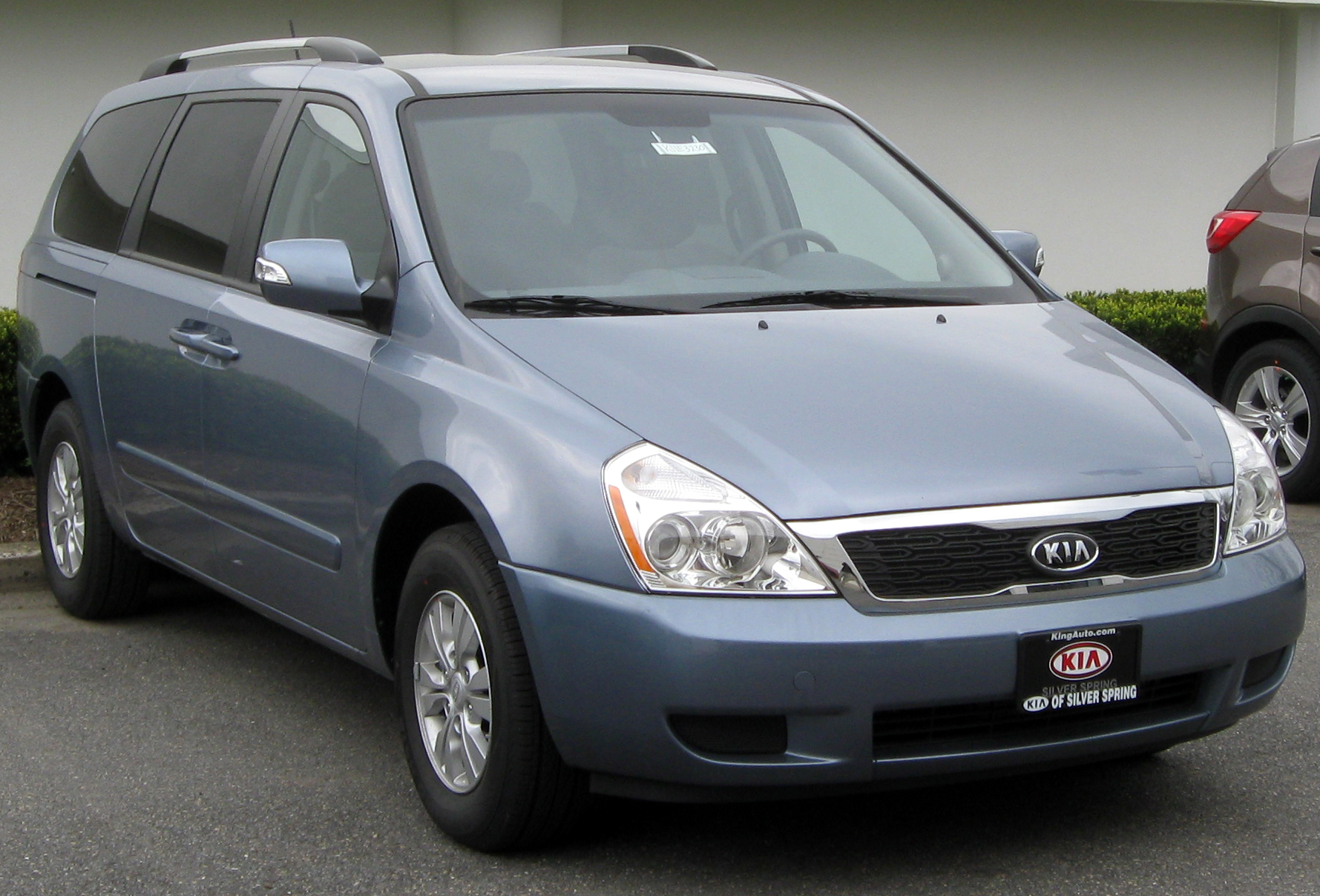
2011 Kia Sedona LX (facelift, US)

Initially offered only in long-wheelbase (LWB) form, the short-wheelbase (SWB) model followed for the 2007 model year. Trim levels include Sedona (SWB), Sedona LX (LWB) and Sedona EX (LWB). A rebadged version of the second generation was offered from 2007 to 2009 as the Hyundai Entourage.

The van was updated for the 2011 model year with a new Tiger Nose grille and taillights, a more powerful engine and a six-speed automatic transmission, but dropped the short-wheelbase version because of poor sales.

The North American configuration earned a five-star safety rating from the National Highway Traffic Safety Administration for all seating positions in frontal and side-impact crashes. The Insurance Institute for Highway Safety also rated the Sedona "Good" – its highest rating – in front, side and rear impacts. The IIHS has christened the 2006 Sedona a "Gold Top Safety Pick", making the Sedona (and the similar Hyundai Entourage) the safest minivan currently tested. Kia had announced that the 2012 Kia Sedona will be the last Sedona for the American market.

In May 2012, Kia said the Sedona would be discontinued in the US market after the 2012 model year, with a company spokesperson saying the company did not expect to permanently leave the minivan market.

In 2013, after one year's hiatus, Kia relaunched the Sedona in the US as a 2014 model with minor updates.

==== United Kingdom ====
The second-generation Sedona was the second top-selling large MPV in the UK market, and in 2010 received a new grille, new equipment (including a reversing camera built into the rear-view mirror) and a single engine choice, a 192 PS (141 kW; 189 hp) 2.2 CRDi inline-four replacing the 183 PS (135 kW; 180 hp) 2.9 CRDi. The second generation was marketed in three trim levels (1, 2 and 3) with a 5-speed manual transmission or six-speed automatic gearbox. Trim level 1 included air conditioning and electric windows. Trim level 2 received alloy wheels, rear parking camera with the display incorporated into the rear-view mirror, and climate control. Trim level 3 added electronic stability control, leather seats, heated front seats, power tailgate and powered folding door mirrors.

In September 2012, the Sedona was withdrawn from the UK market due to poor sales.

==== Australia ====
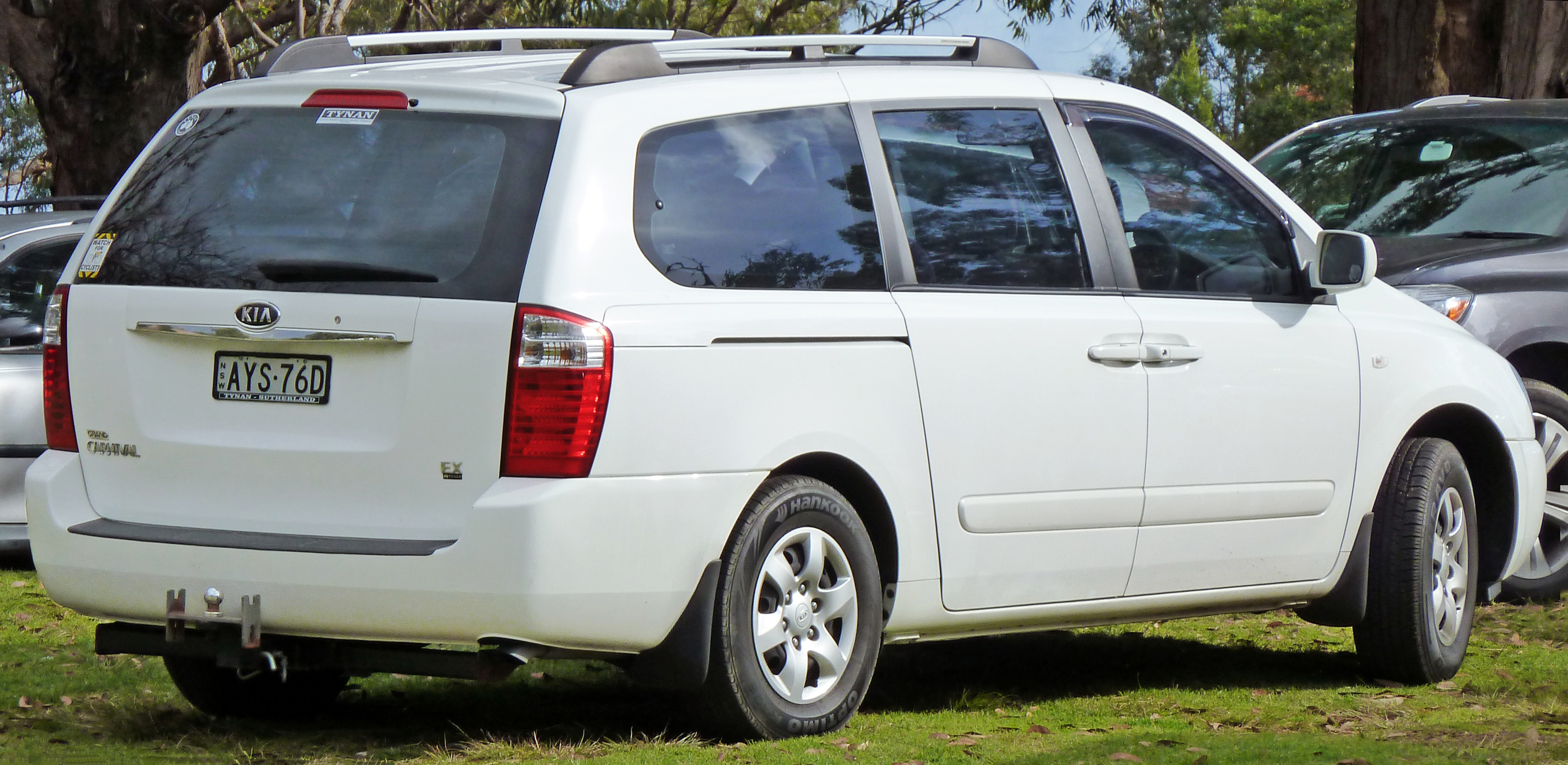
2006–2008 Kia Grand Carnival EX (Australia)

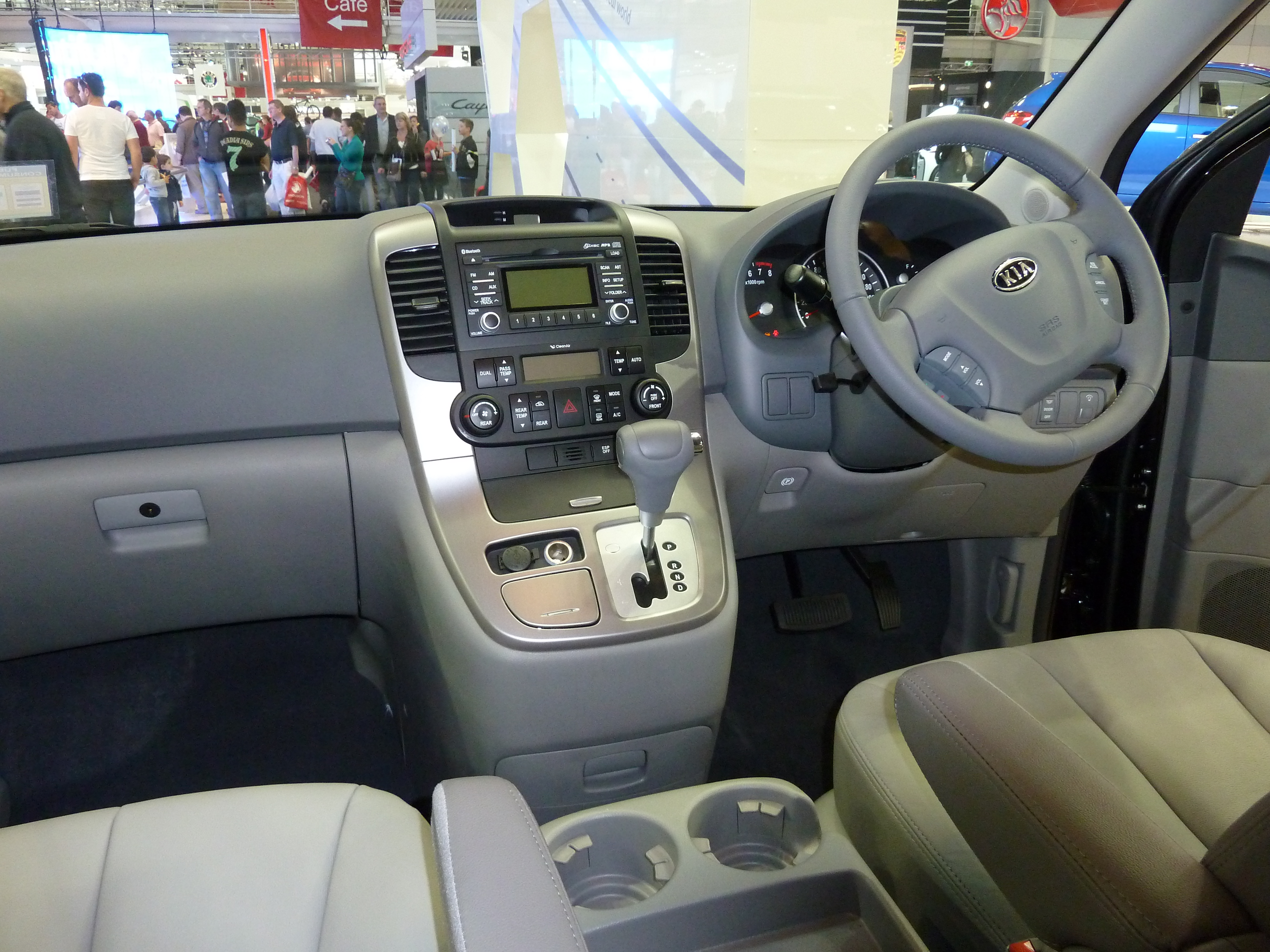
Interior

The second-generation Carnival went on sale in Australia in January 2006. Initially, the long-wheelbase 3.8L V6 5-speed automatic Grand Carnival was sold alongside the previous generation 2.5L V6 Carnival, until the second-generation SWB Carnival arrived in August of that year, available in both 5-speed manual and 4-speed automatic, and new 2.7L V6 engine. Both models sat 8 passengers. A 2.9L turbo diesel engine was introduced in the Grand Carnival in March 2009. In June 2010, the Carnival and Grand Carnival underwent a mild facelift, the manual transmission was dropped from the SWB model, and the LWB model received a new 3.5L V6 and 6-speed automatic. In 2011, the SWB Carnival was dropped entirely, while the LWB model gained the new 2.2L "R" series diesel engine, replacing the previous 2.9L engine. The Carnival was Australia's best-selling people mover between 2007 and 2013.

=== Reception ===
The Kia Sedona (Carnival) has received the 2007 MotorWeek "Best Minivan" award in its 2007 Drivers' Choice Awards and The Car Book's 2007 "Best Bet" distinction. Overall, Kia models improved 22% in J.D. Power and Associates 2006 Initial Quality Study (IQS), and improved twice as much as any competitor in the last 3 years.

The Kia Sedona ranked 4th the "20 least expensive 2009 vehicles to insure" list by Insure.com. Edmunds.com names Kia Sedona as one of the "Top Recommended" Vehicles for 2010.

=== Reliability ===
- In the 2007 reliability report published by TÜV, 1st generation (1999–2005) of Kia Carnival placed 113th out of 113 in the 2- to 3-year-old cars category, with a defect rate of 25.1%. In the 2008 TÜV report, 1st generation (1999–2005) of Kia Carnival placed 116th out of 116 in the same category, with a defect rate of 19.70%, and also placed 111th out of 111 in the 4- to 5-year-old cars category, with a defect rate of 27.60%.
- According to MSN autos reliability survey, 2006 Kia Sedona reliability rated as good, overall 5/5. It rated as "Minimal Problems", and comment as "Infrequent problems reported, all with low repair costs." MSN Autos use Identifix for data on all automobiles.
- According to MyRide.com reliability survey, The MyRide Reliability Ratings are collected from visitors and past customers of Autobytel Inc.'s websites (Autobytel.com, Autoweb.com and CarSmart.com) who own vehicles from model year 2001 and newer via an online survey conducted by an independent third party.

Durability scored 86 (Industrial average 80)
Mechanical Quality scored 89 (Industrial average 80)

- The 2009 Kia Sedona's JD Power reliability score is same as the 2009 Honda Odyssey and 2009 Dodge Grand Caravan.

=== Hyundai Entourage ===
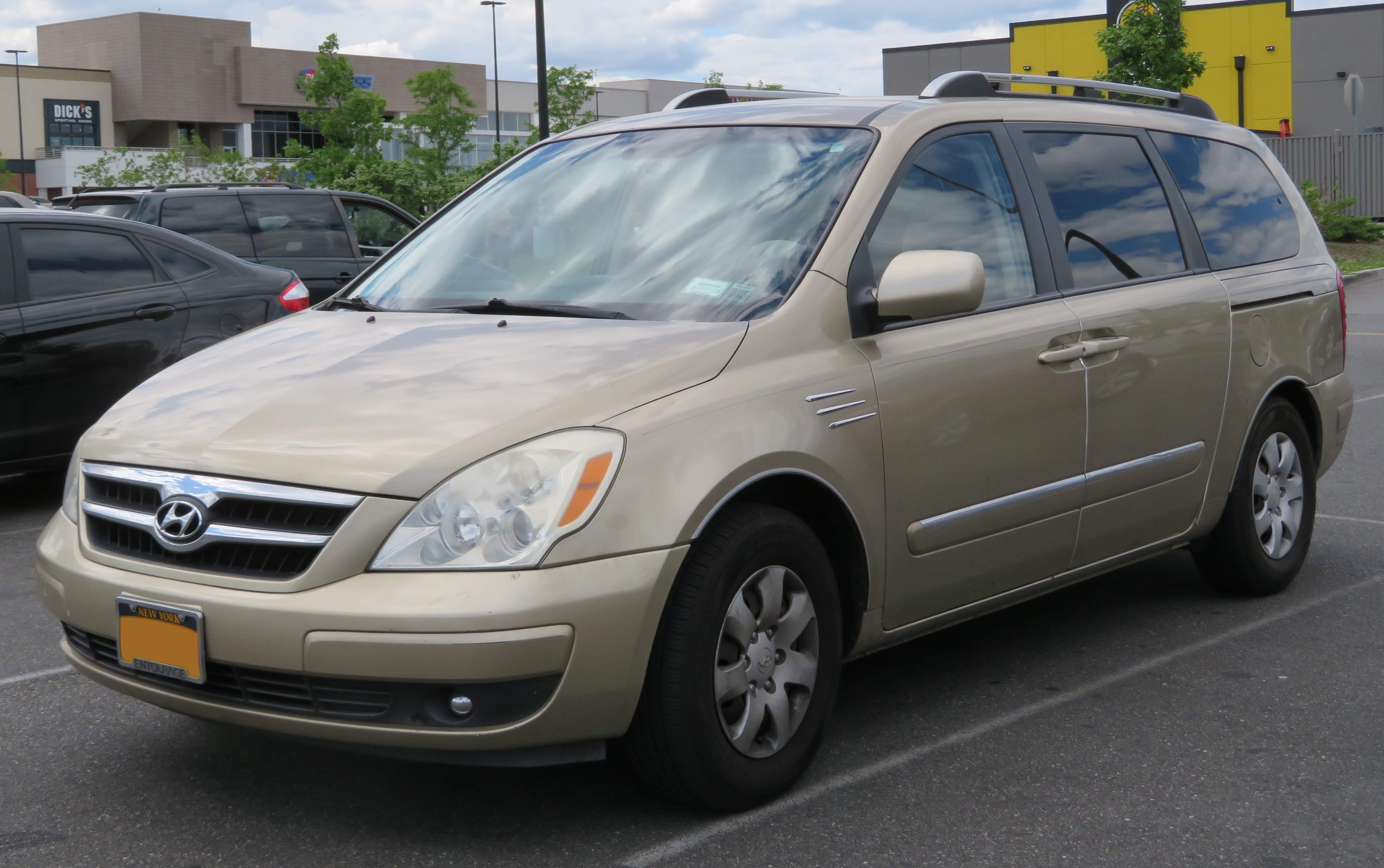

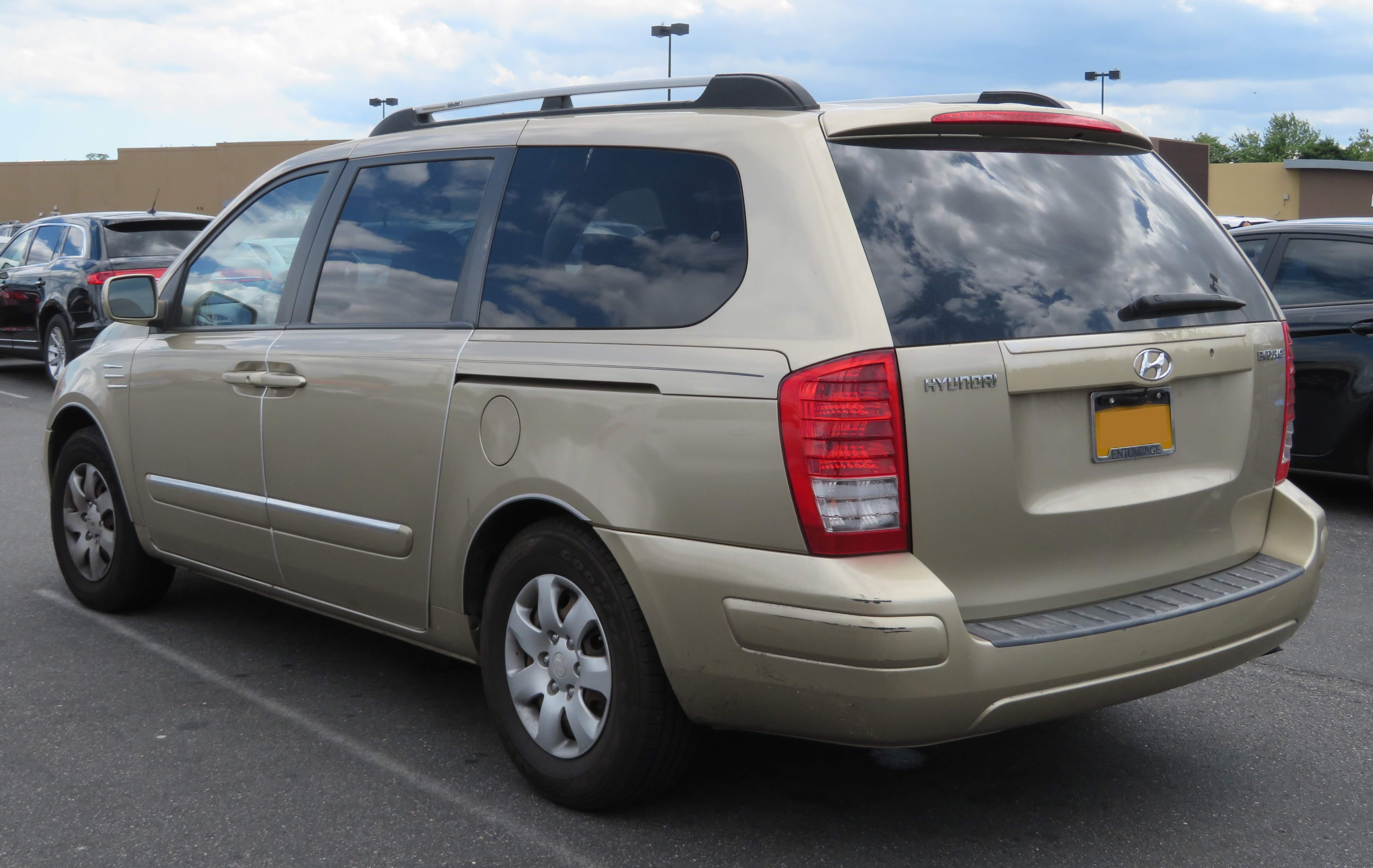
2007 Hyundai Entourage GLS (US)

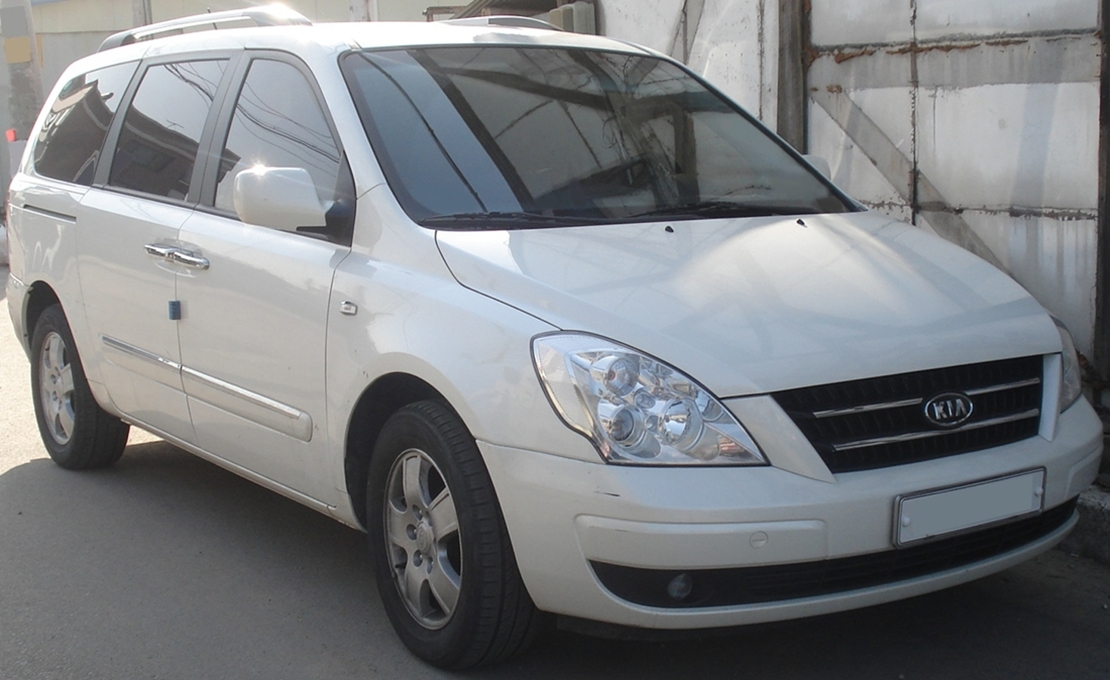
Kia Carnival Limousine (South Korea), based on the Hyundai Entourage styling

From 2006 to 2009, Kia manufactured a rebadged variant of the Carnival for sister company Hyundai. Manufactured in Kia's Sohari Plant and marketed as the Hyundai Entourage, the production Entourage was shown at the Chicago Auto Show in February 2006 and went on sale in April 2006 in long wheelbase form.

The Entourage was powered by the company's 3.8 L Lambda V6, seated seven, and offered optional equipment including automatic climate control, leather seating, power sliding doors and tailgate, reverse sensors, and a six-disc in-dash CD changer.

In April 2009, the Entourage was discontinued in North America for the 2010 model year. Entourage's revised styling was adopted in South Korea as a facelift for the Kia Carnival, except for revised grilles suited to the Kia brand.

==== Trim levels ====
- The (base) GLS model features 16-inch wheels, removable second-row captain's chairs, 60/40 split-folding third-row fold-in-floor seat, a six-way manual-adjustable driver seat, tri-zone air-conditioning, six-speaker CD stereo, cruise control, power windows and door locks and keyless entry.
- The SE level adds 17-inch alloys, dual power-sliding rear doors, heated mirrors, automatic climate control, a leather-wrapped steering wheel with audio controls wood or metal accents and an eight-way power-adjustable driver seat.
- The Limited trim level includes a power opening/closing liftgate, heated leather seats and an electroluminescent instrument cluster – with optional sunroof, 13-speaker surround-sound audio system, four-way power front-passenger seat, power-adjustable pedals and seating memory system.

==== Awards ====
The American configuration of the Hyundai Entourage earned a five-star safety rating–the highest honor the National Highway Traffic Safety Administration bestows–for all seating positions in frontal and side-impact crashes. The Insurance Institute for Highway Safety (IIHS) rates the Entourage "Good"–its highest rating – in front, side and rear impacts. The IIHS rated the 2007 Entourage a "Gold Top Safety Pick," making Entourage with the similar Kia Sedona the safest minivans tested for 2007.

The 2009 Hyundai Entourage minivan was recognized as a Best Family Car for 2009 by Parents magazine and Edmunds.com in their annual list of family vehicles.

The Hyundai Entourage ranked 3rd for the "20 least expensive 2009 vehicles to insure" list by Insure.com. According to research, the Entourage is one of the least expensive vehicle to insure. Low rates tend to reflect a vehicle's safety, and the drivers who tend to buy them.

=== Safety ===
ANCAP test results* Kia Carnival variants with side & curtain airbags (2006)
Test	Score
Overall	4 /5 stars
Frontal offset	9.81/16
Side impact	16/16
Pole	2/2
Seat belt reminders	1/3
Whiplash protection	Not Assessed
Pedestrian protection	Poor
Electronic stability control	Optional

== Third generation (YP; 2014) ==
Third generation
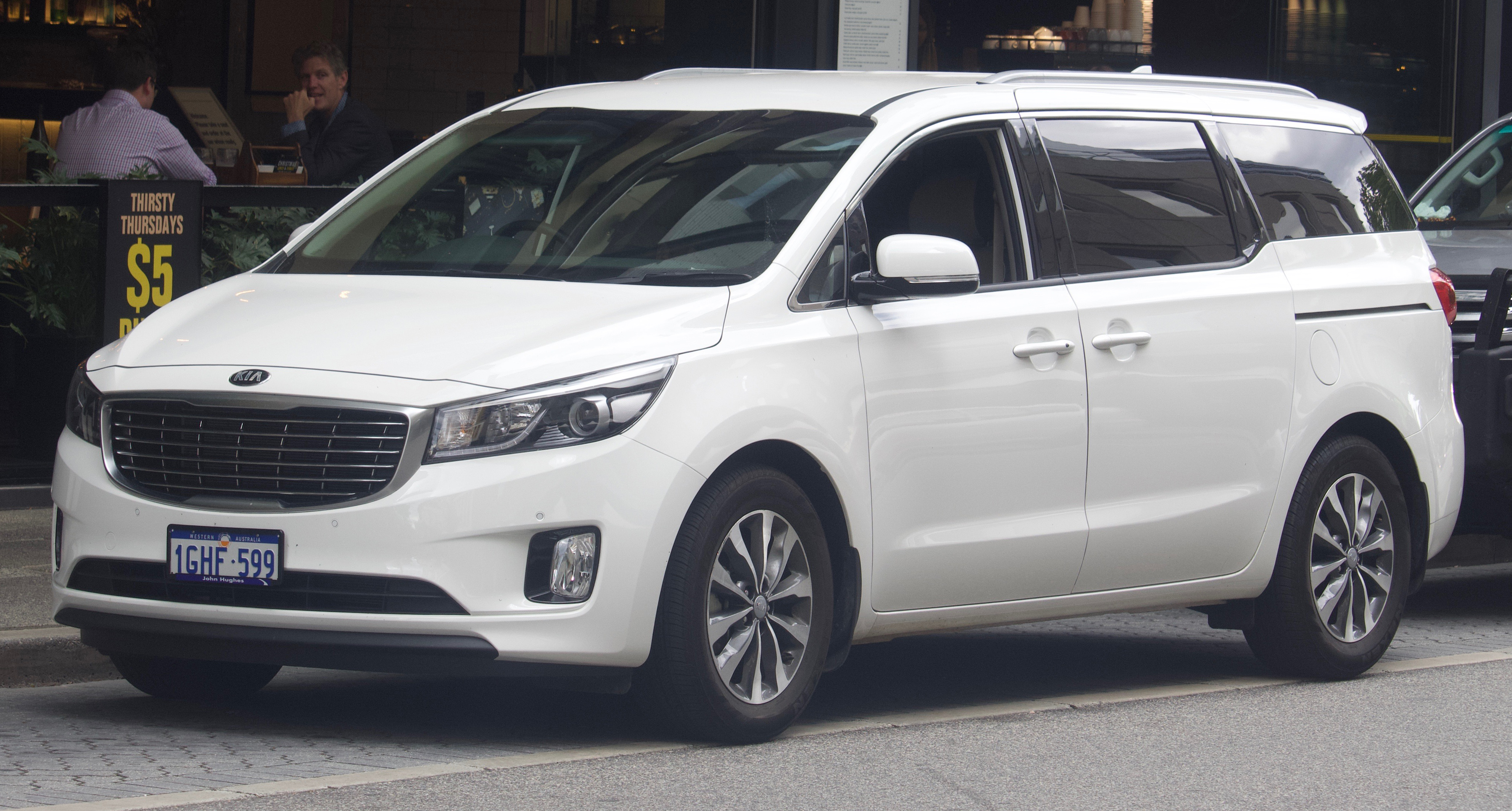
- 2017 Kia Carnival SLi (pre-facelift, Australia)

Overview
- Model code: YP
- Also called: Kia Grand Carnival; Kia Grand Sedona; Kia Sedona
- Production: 2014–2020
- Model years: 2015–2020 (Middle East); 2015–2021 (North America)
- Assembly: South Korea: Gwangmyeong (Sohari Plant); India: Anantapur, Andhra Pradesh (Kia India); Malaysia: Gurun (Naza); Vietnam: Núi Thành, Quảng Nam
- Designer: Sang Hun Ahn; Je Won Seo (2018 facelift)

Body and chassis
- Related: Kia Sorento (UM)

Powertrain
- Engine: Petrol: 3.3 L Lambda II MPi V6; 3.3 L Lambda II GDi V6; Diesel: 2.2 L R II CRDi VGT I4
- Transmission: 6-speed automatic; 8-speed automatic

Dimensions
- Wheelbase: 3,060 mm (120.5 in)
- Length: 5,115 mm (201.4 in)
- Width: 1,985 mm (78.1 in)
- Height: 1,740–1,755 mm (68.5–69.1 in)
- Curb weight: 2,015–2,198 kg (4,442–4,846 lb)

The third generation Carnival/Sedona debuted in April 2014 at the New York International Auto Show for the 2015 model year. For the United States market, the Sedona features the Lambda Gasoline Direct Injection (GDI) 3.3-litre V6 engine producing 206 kW (276 hp) and 336 N⋅m (248 lb⋅ft), six-speed automatic transmission and front-wheel drive. For the South Korean market, it is available only with the 2.2-litre CRDi diesel engine which produces 147 kW (197 hp) and 440 N⋅m (320 lb⋅ft).

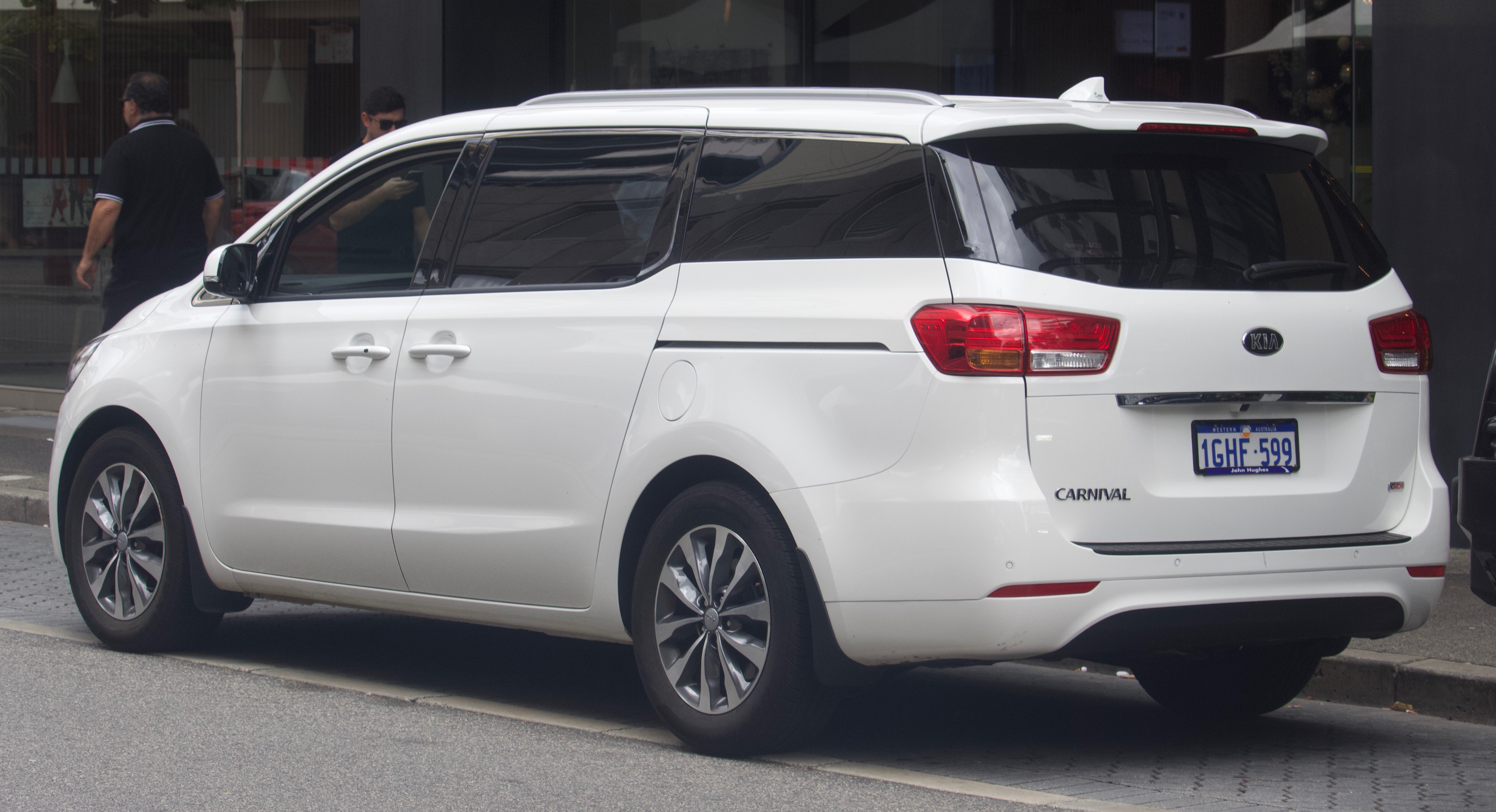
2017 Kia Carnival SLi (pre-facelift, Australia)

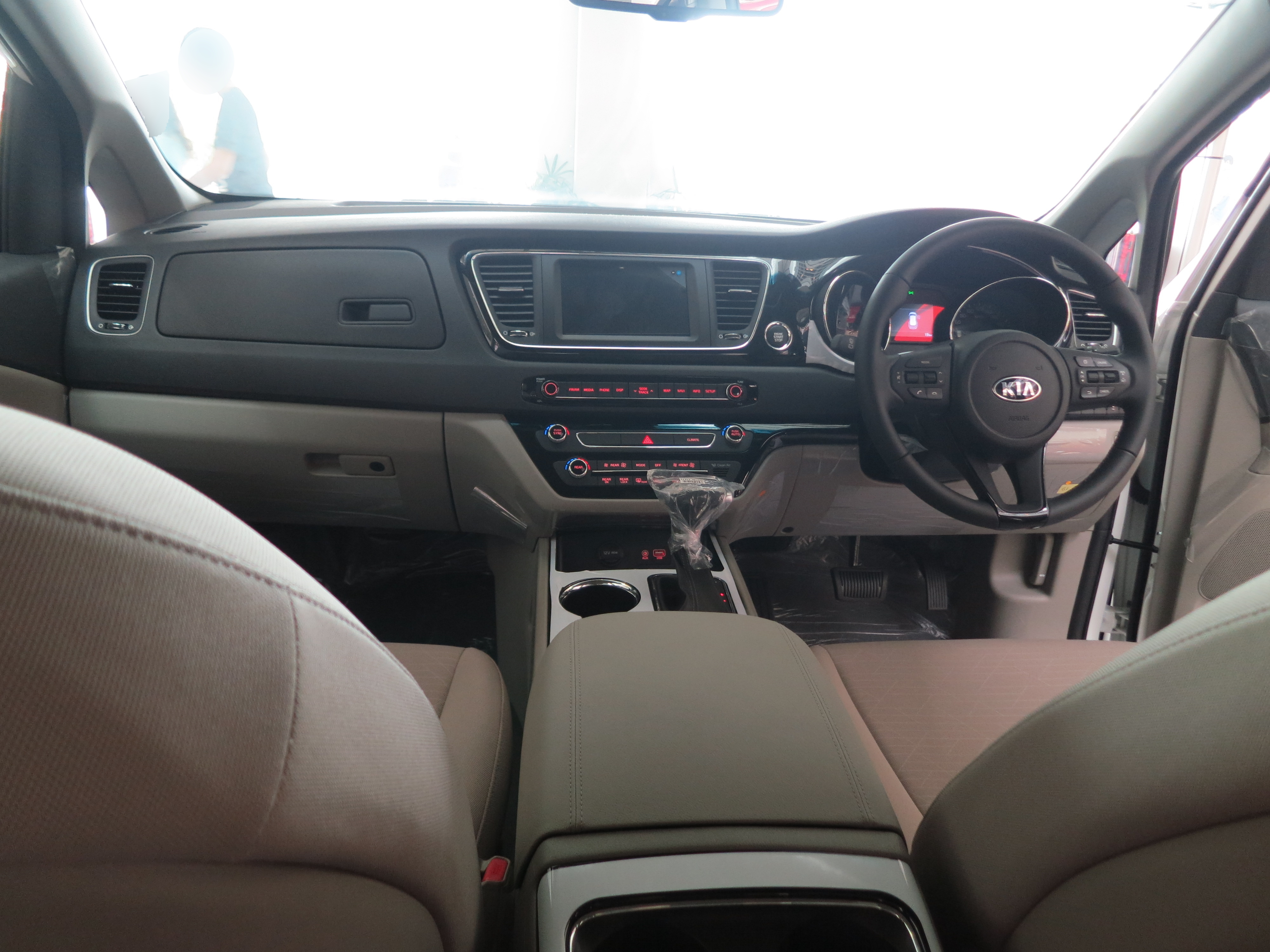
Interior

=== Markets ===
==== Australia ====
In Australia, the Carnival is available in S, Si, SLi and Platinum trim levels with the choice of either the Lambda 3.3-litre GDI V6 or the R-Series 2.2-litre I4 Diesel mated to a 6-speed automatic, while models from 2018 came standard with an 8-speed automatic. Since its Australian debut in February 2015, the Carnival has consistently been Australia's top selling people mover averaging around 500 sales per month, while for the year of 2019, 6,493 Carnival's had been registered.

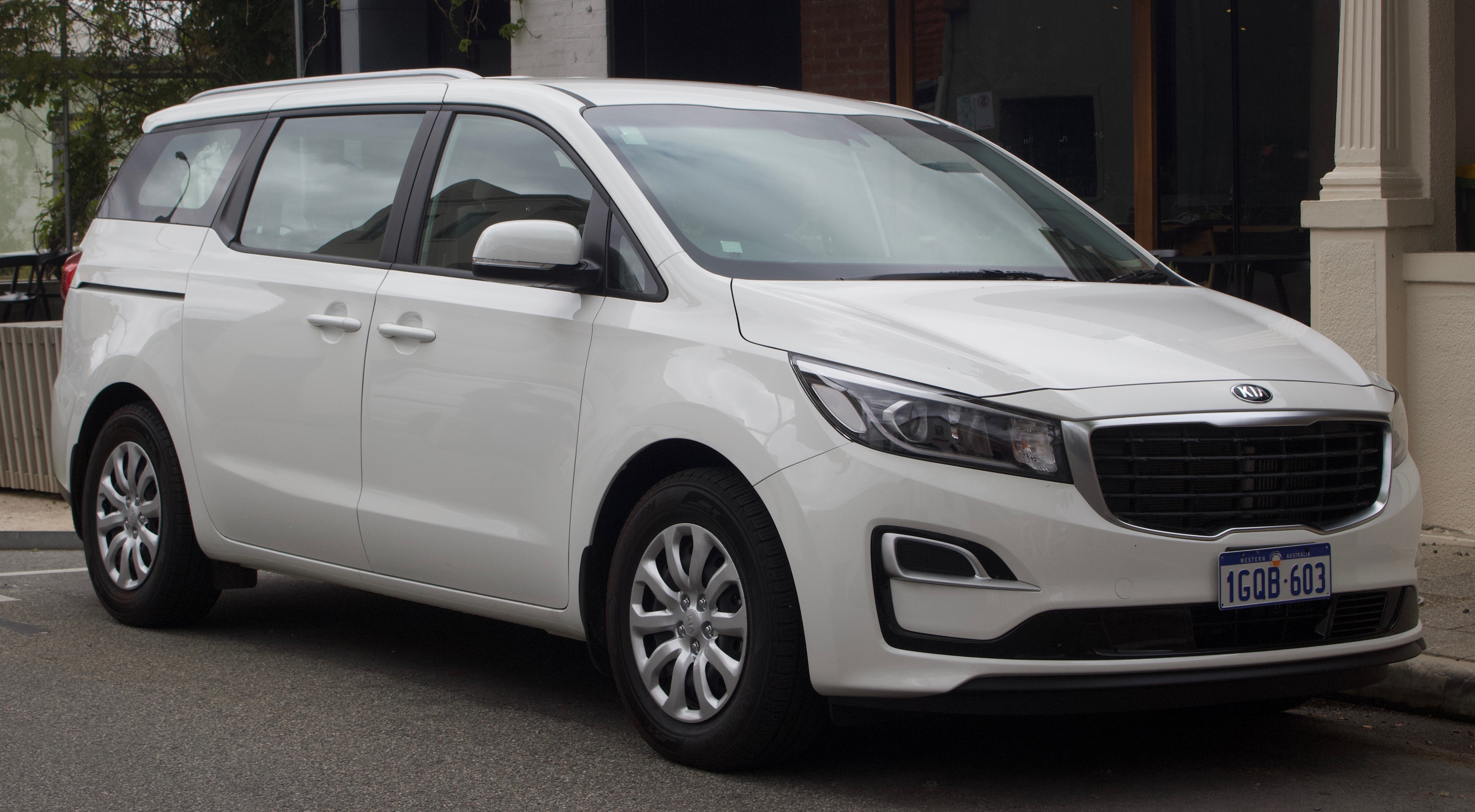

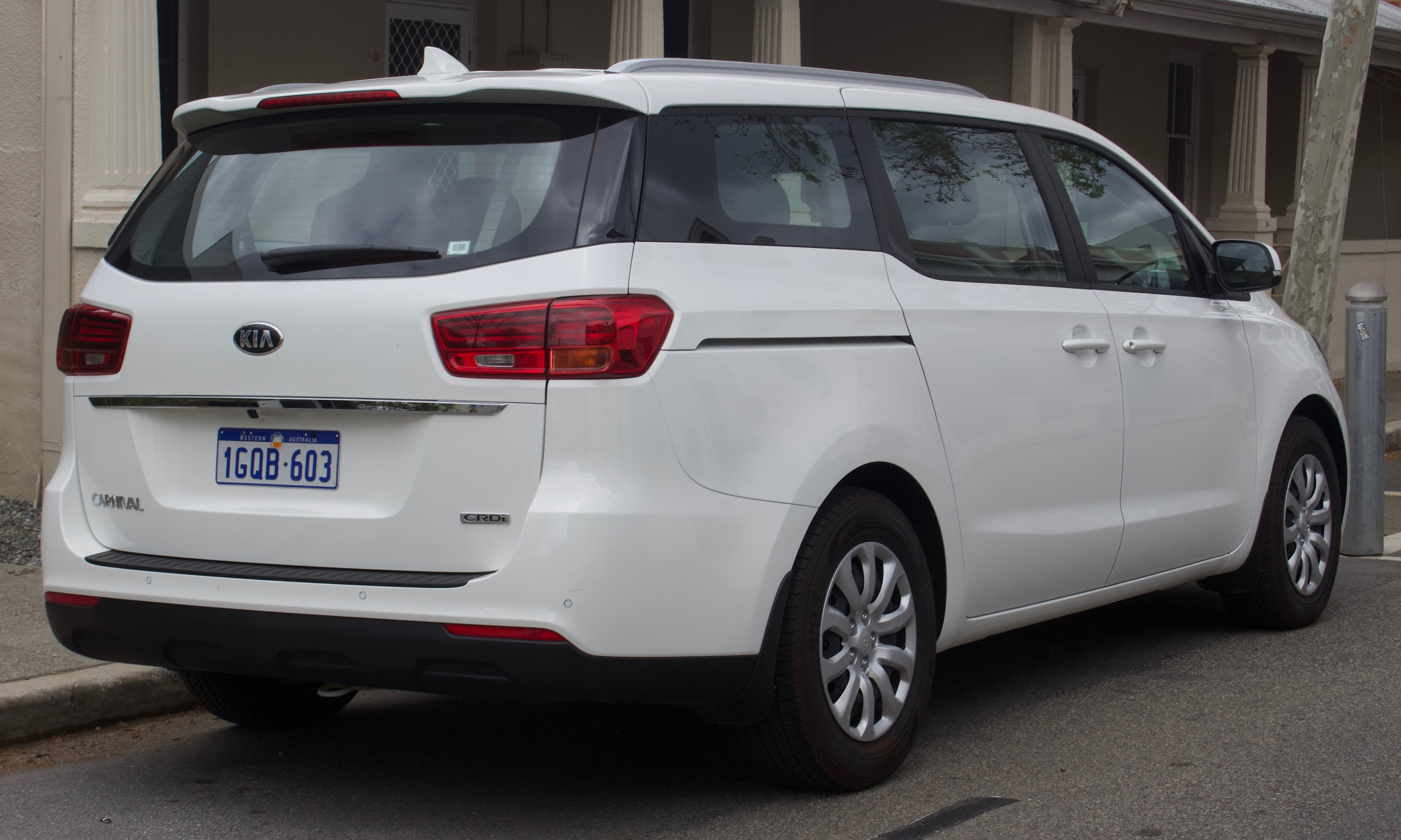
2018 Kia Carnival S (facelift, Australia)

==== India ====
Kia India launched the Carnival in India on 5 February 2020 at the Auto Expo 2020. The Indian version is powered by a 2.2-litre CRDi diesel engine, mated to an eight speed automatic transmission. The Carnival is available in three variants, which are Prestige, Limousine and Limousine+. This model sold more than 14,500 units before it was withdrawn in 2023.

==== Indonesia ====
In Indonesia, the Grand Sedona was launched in August 2016 at the 24th Gaikindo Indonesia International Auto Show in petrol variant. The diesel variant and facelifted version of the Grand Sedona was launched at the 26th Gaikindo Indonesia International Auto Show in August 2018.

==== Malaysia ====
The third generation Carnival was launched in Malaysia in March 2017 as the Grand Carnival as a fully imported vehicle. In January 2018, the vehicle became locally assembled in Malaysia. The Malaysian market Grand Carnival is powered by the 2.2 litre diesel engine with a six-speed automatic transmission. Kia launched the eight-speed automatic transmission in October 2018.

==== Mexico ====
The facelifted Sedona was introduced in Mexico on 5 September 2018 as a 2019 model. It is offered in four trim lines; LX, EX, EX Pack and SXL trim levels. All versions feature a 3.3-litre engine.

==== Saudi Arabia ====
In Saudi Arabia, it is available in the Grand Carnival version and comes in the LX and EX trim levels, whereby EX being the top-of-the-line with some SX-L features.

==== Thailand ====
In Thailand, Yontrakit Kia Motor Co. Ltd has launched the Kia Grand Carnival in Thailand. In November 2019, Yontrakit Kia started importing the Carnival LX trim level from Vietnam instead of South Korea, resulting in significant price reduction due to the ASEAN free trade area.

==== United States ====
In the United States, the Sedona was previously only available in LX and EX trim levels. In 2015, Kia expanded the trim levels to L, LX, EX, SX and Limited.

==== Vietnam ====
In Vietnam, the Grand Sedona is manufactured in joint venture with THACO at the Chu Lai plant in Quang Nam Province Initially imported from South Korea, it is available in a sole comes in two engine versions. main muscle: Gasoline version: Uses a 3.3L engine. Diesel version: Uses a 2.2L engine.In October 2015,Grand Sedona is locally assembled in Vietnam with 4 gasoline and diesel engine versions . This model is exported to Thailand since 2019.

==== Pakistan ====
In Pakistan, the Grand Carnival was launched in 2018 following Kia's relaunch into the Pakistani market. Two trim levels were made available namely the base LX and the EX.

=== Safety ===
ANCAP test results* Kia Carnival V6 petrol variants (2015)
Test	Score
Overall	4 /5 stars
Frontal offset	10.48/16
Side impact	16/16
Pole	2/2
Seat belt reminders	2/3
Whiplash protection	Good
Pedestrian protection	Adequate
Electronic stability control	Standard

ANCAP test results* Kia Carnival all variants (2016)
Test	Score
Overall	5 /5 stars
Frontal offset	14.29/16
Side impact	16/16
Pole	2/2
Seat belt reminders	2.3/3
Whiplash protection	Good
Pedestrian protection	Adequate
Electronic stability control	Standard

== Fourth generation (KA4; 2020) ==
Fourth generation
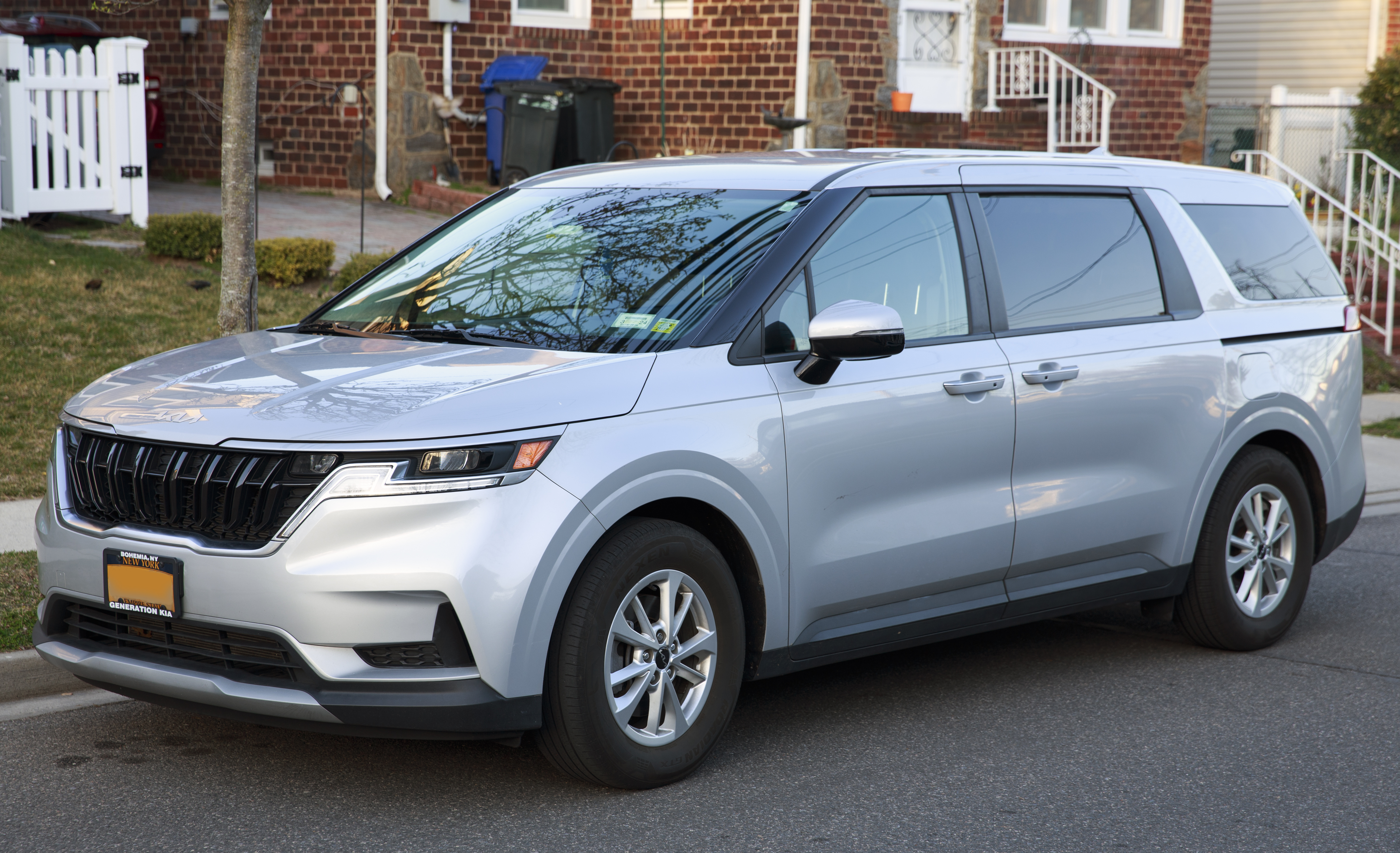
- 2022 Kia Carnival LX (US)

Overview
- Model code: KA4
- Also called: Kia Grand Carnival (Indonesia, 2021-2024)
- Production: 2020–present
- Model years: 2021–present (Middle East); 2022–present (North America)
- Assembly: South Korea: Gwangmyeong (Sohari Plant); China: Yancheng (Yueda Kia); Russia: Kaliningrad (Avtotor, 2021-2022); Vietnam: Chu Lai, Quảng Nam (THACO Kia); Malaysia: Kulim, Kedah (Inokom)
- Designer: Park Jung-Yong

Body and chassis
- Body style: 5-door minivan
- Platform: Hyundai-Kia N3
- Related: Kia Sorento (MQ4); Hyundai Custo; Hyundai Staria

Powertrain
- Engine: Petrol: 2.0 L Smartstream G2.0 T-GDi I4; 3.5 L Smartstream G3.5 MPi V6; 3.5 L Smartstream G3.5 GDi V6; Petrol hybrid: 1.6 L Smartstream G1.6 T-GDi I4; Diesel: 2.2 L Smartstream D2.2 CRDi VGT I4
- Transmission: 6-speed automatic 8-speed automatic

Dimensions
- Wheelbase: 3,090 mm (121.7 in)
- Length: 5,155 mm (203.0 in)
- Width: 1,995 mm (78.5 in)
- Height: 1,740–1,775 mm (68.5–69.9 in)
- Curb weight: 1,985–2,144 kg (4,376–4,727 lb) (pre-facelift); 2,080–2,165 kg (4,586–4,773 lb) (facelift, standard-roof; South Korea)]

The fourth-generation Carnival debuted in June 2020. Using Hyundai-Kia's new mid-size platform, the fourth-generation Carnival's length has grown by 40 mm (1.6 in) and the wheelbase has been extended by 30 mm (1.2 in). Sales in South Korea began in September 2020.

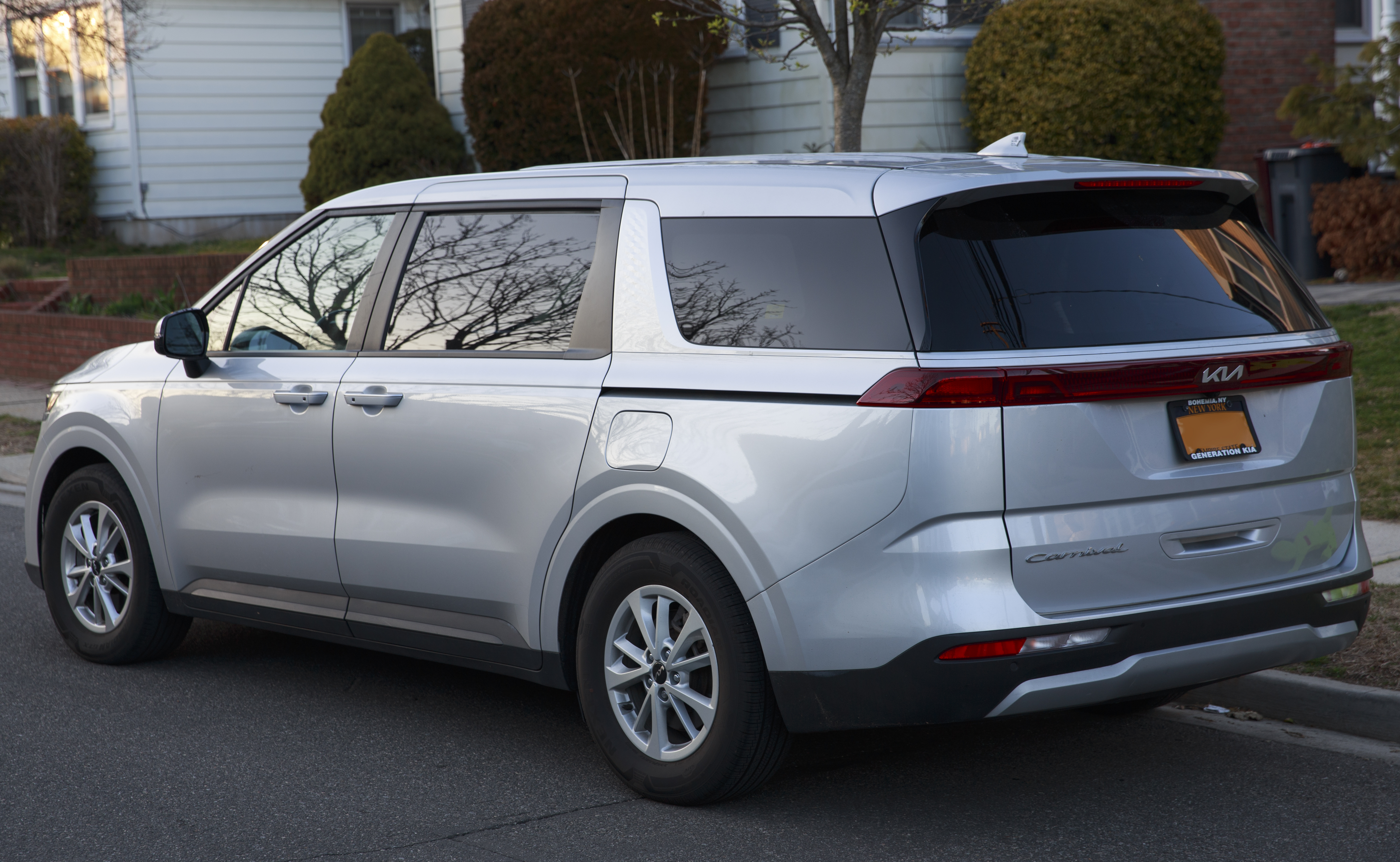
Rear view (US)

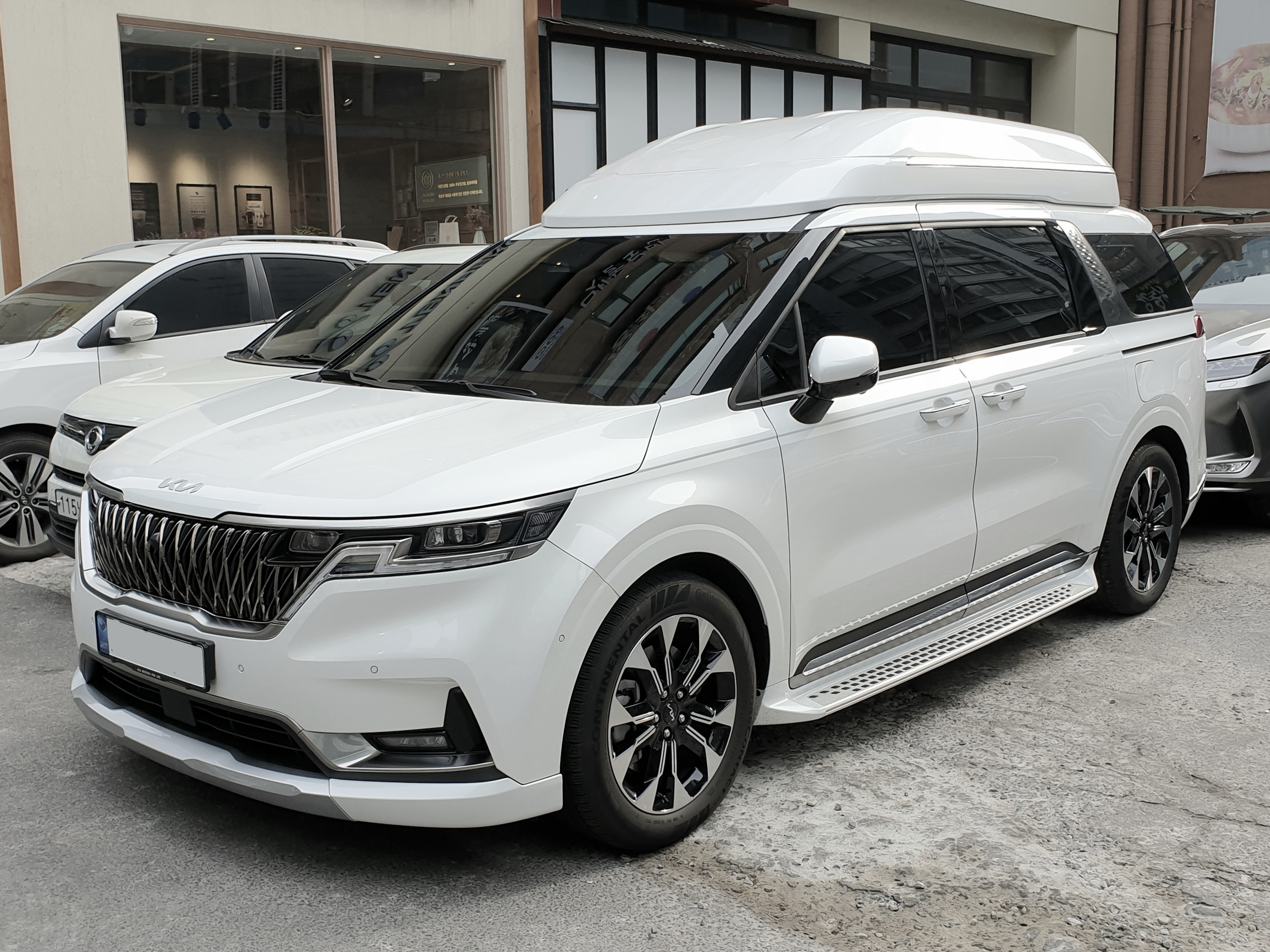
Kia Carnival Limousine (South Korea)

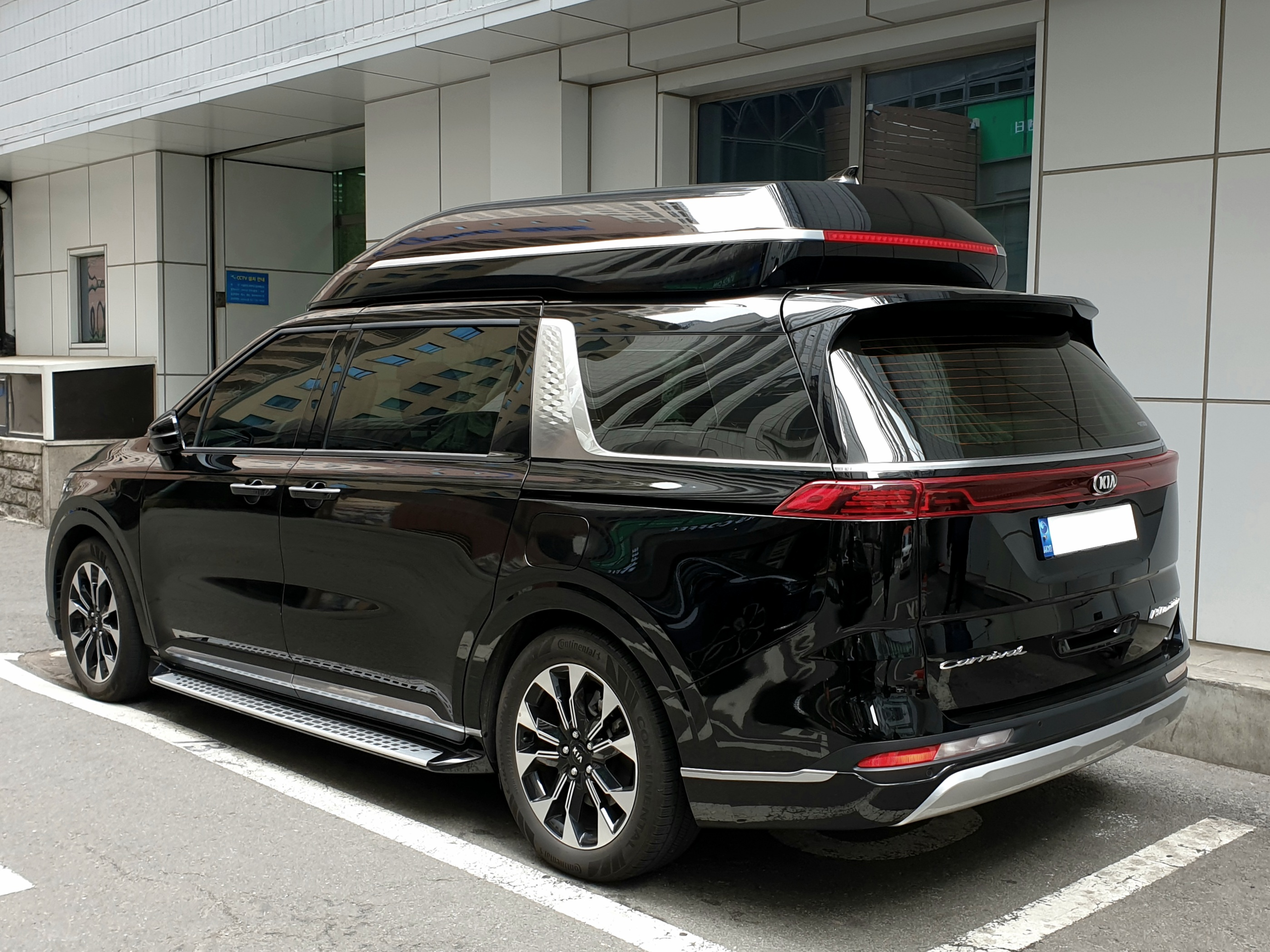
Kia Carnival Limousine (South Korea)

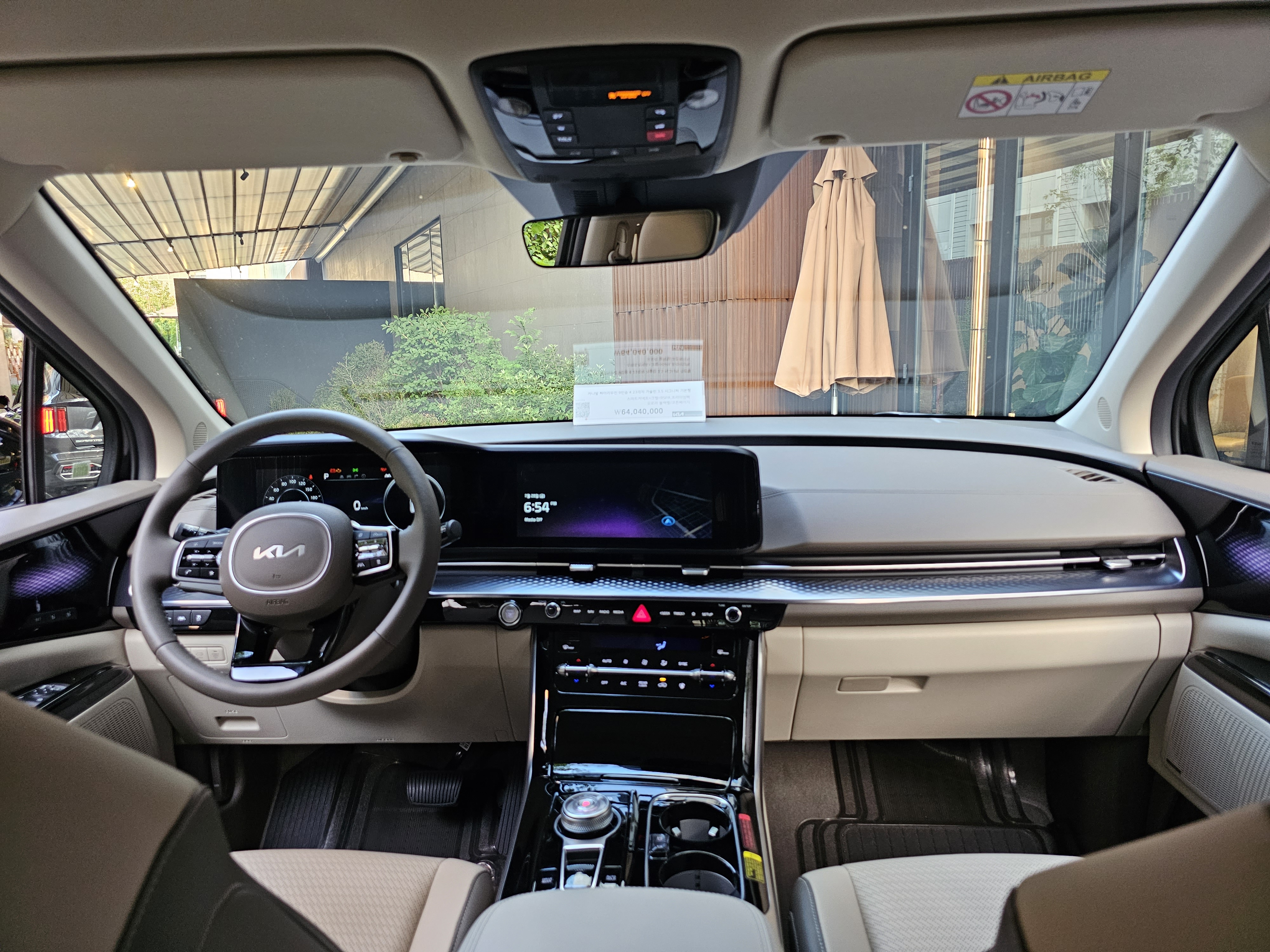
Interior

=== Facelift ===
The exterior design of the facelifted Carnival was revealed in South Korea on 27 October 2023. Changes include new front and rear fascias as part of the brand's Opposites United design language, redesigned headlights and taillights, the deletion of the visible handle for the tailgate release, a revamped interior with an updated centre console and new switchgear, new interior features and the inclusion of a hybrid powertrain.

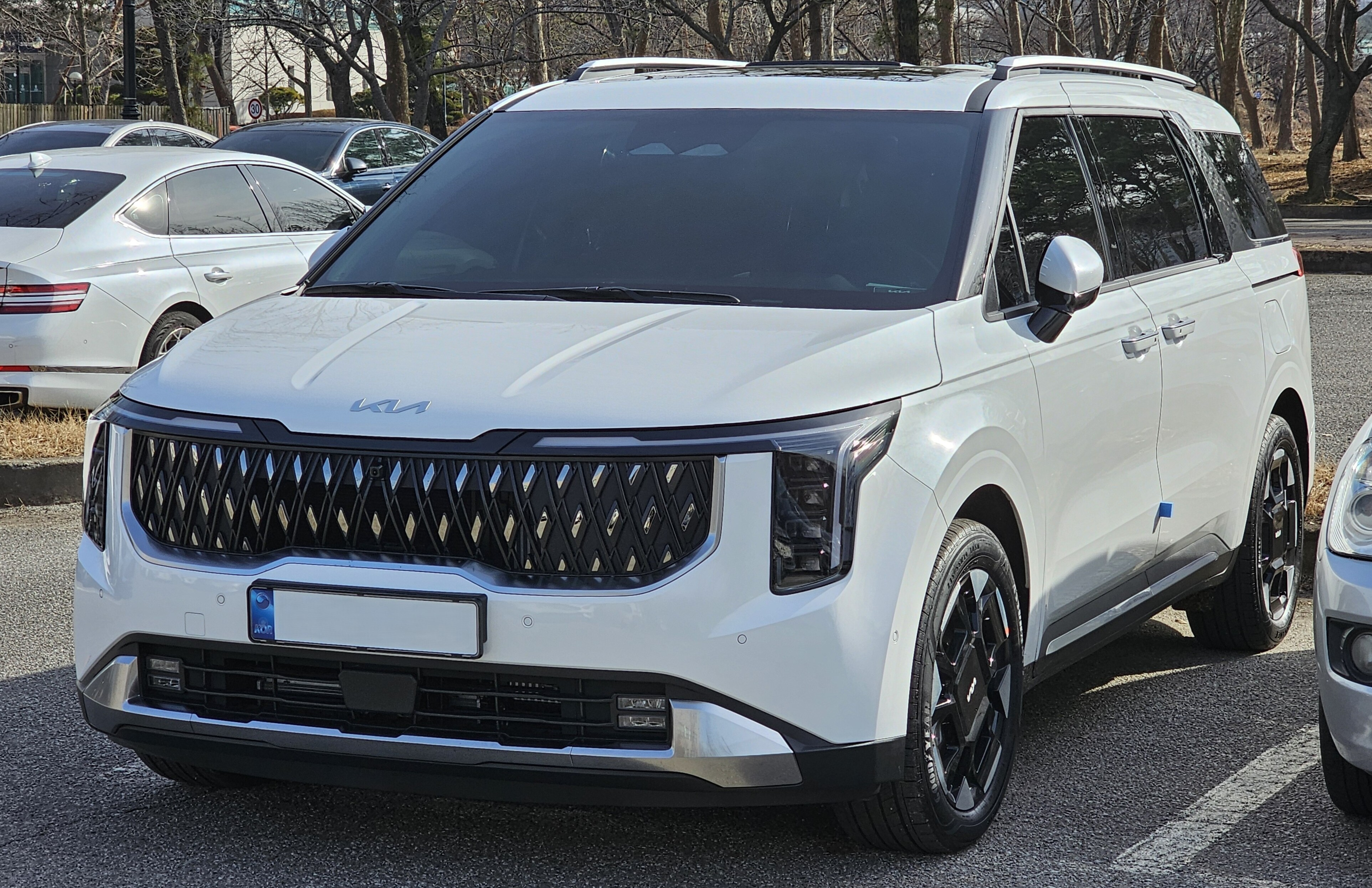
Kia Carnival Hybrid (facelift; South Korea)

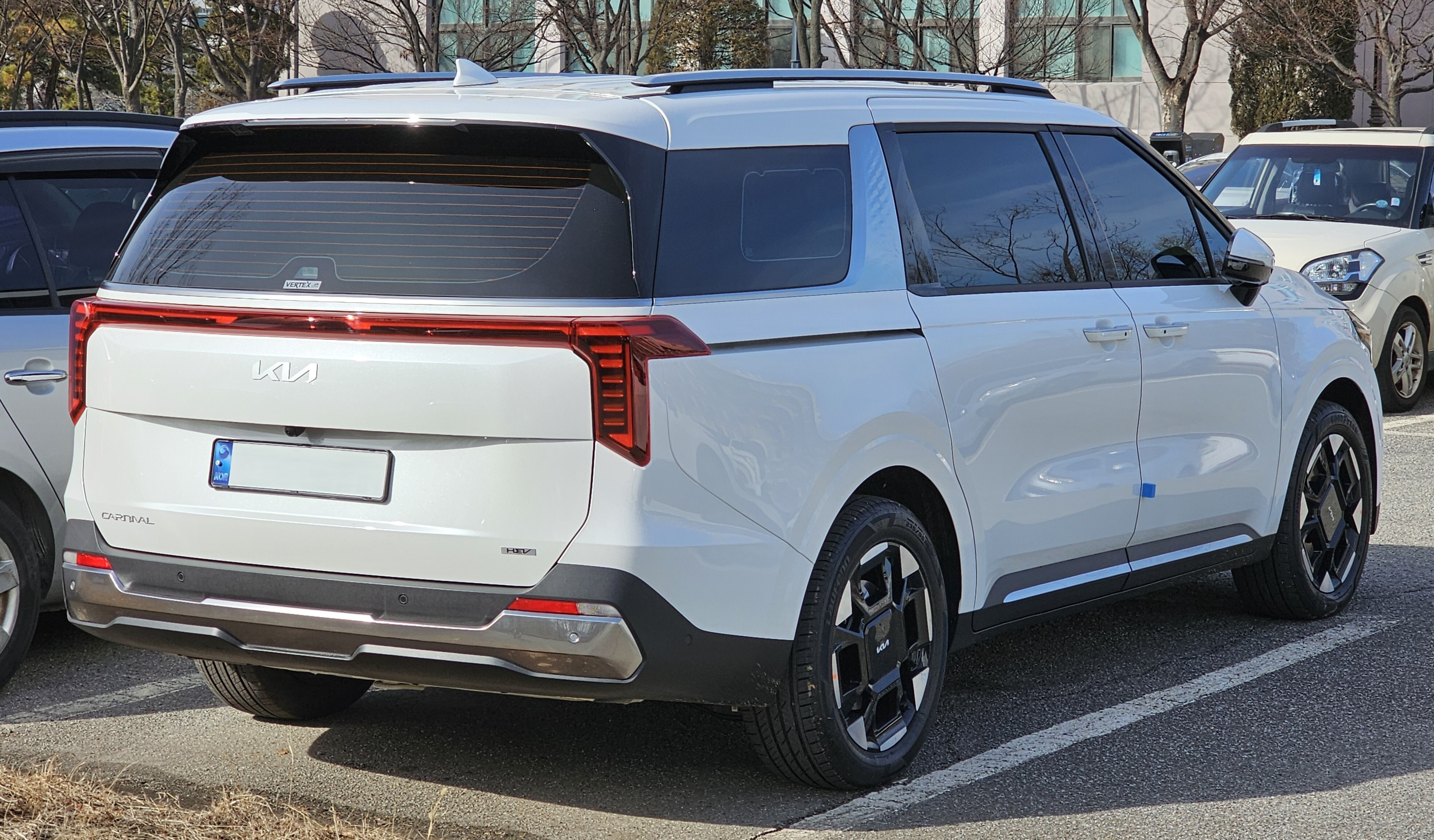
Kia Carnival Hybrid (facelift; South Korea)

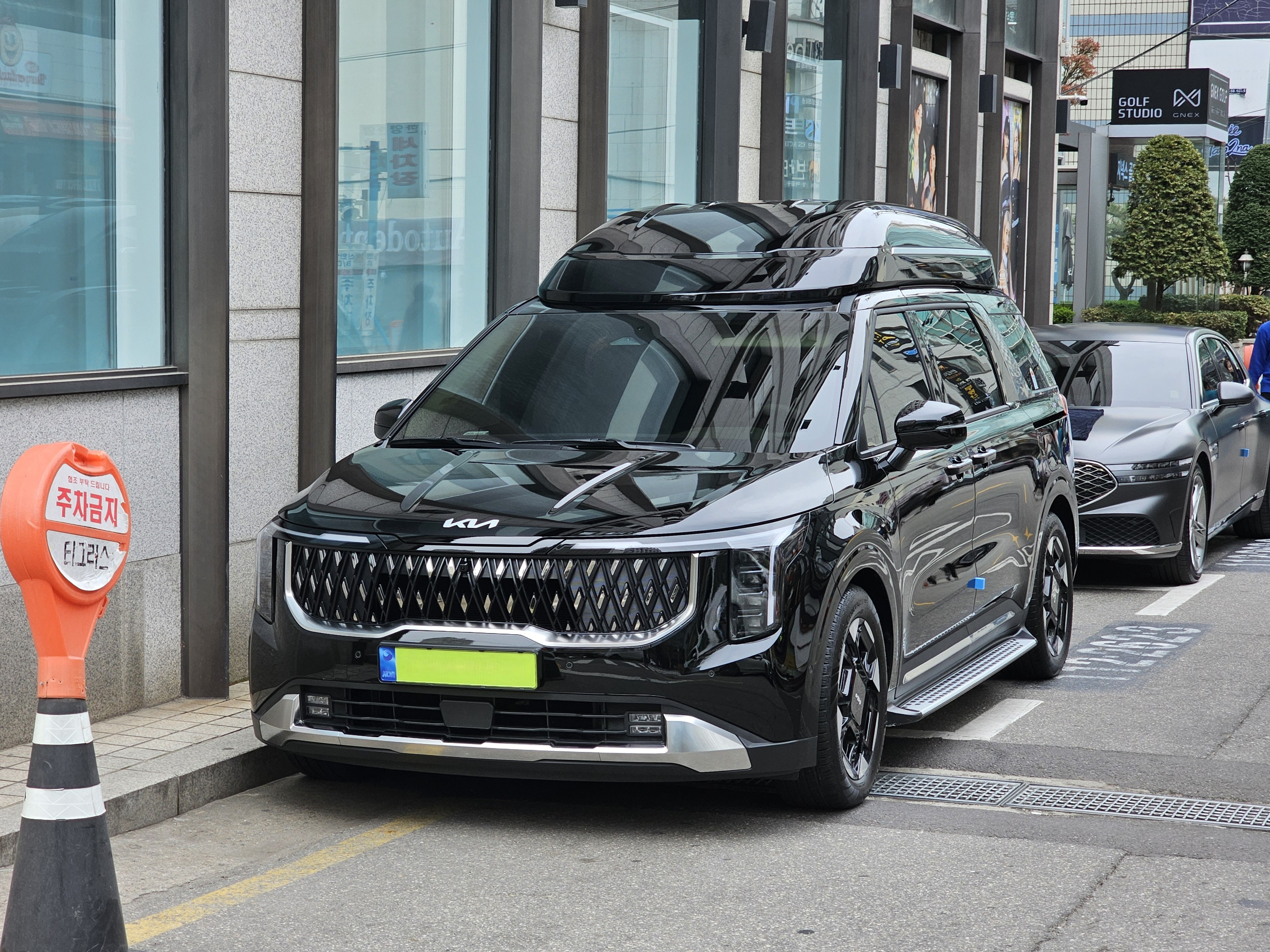
Kia Carnival Limousine (facelift; South Korea)

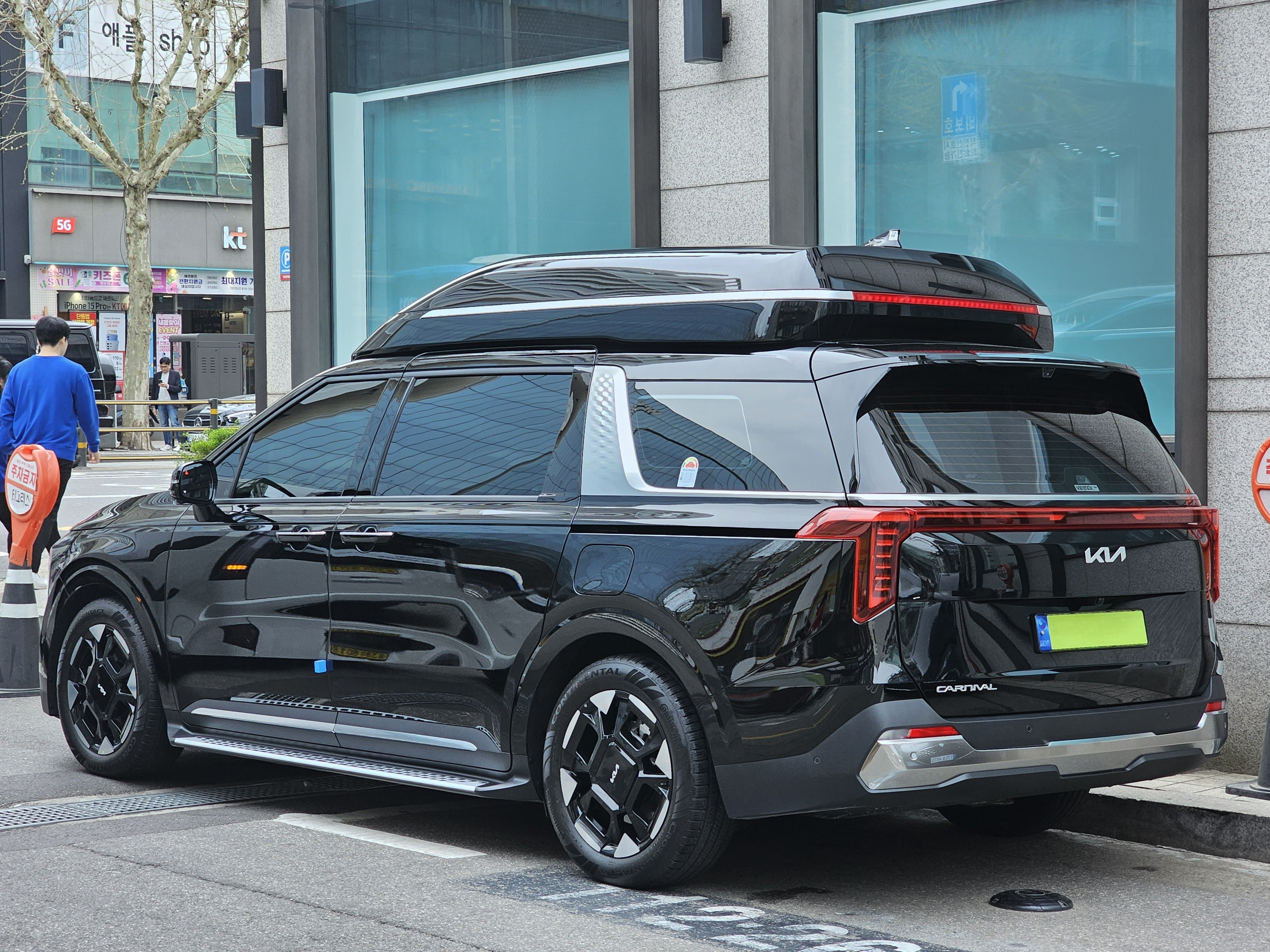
Kia Carnival Limousine (facelift; South Korea)

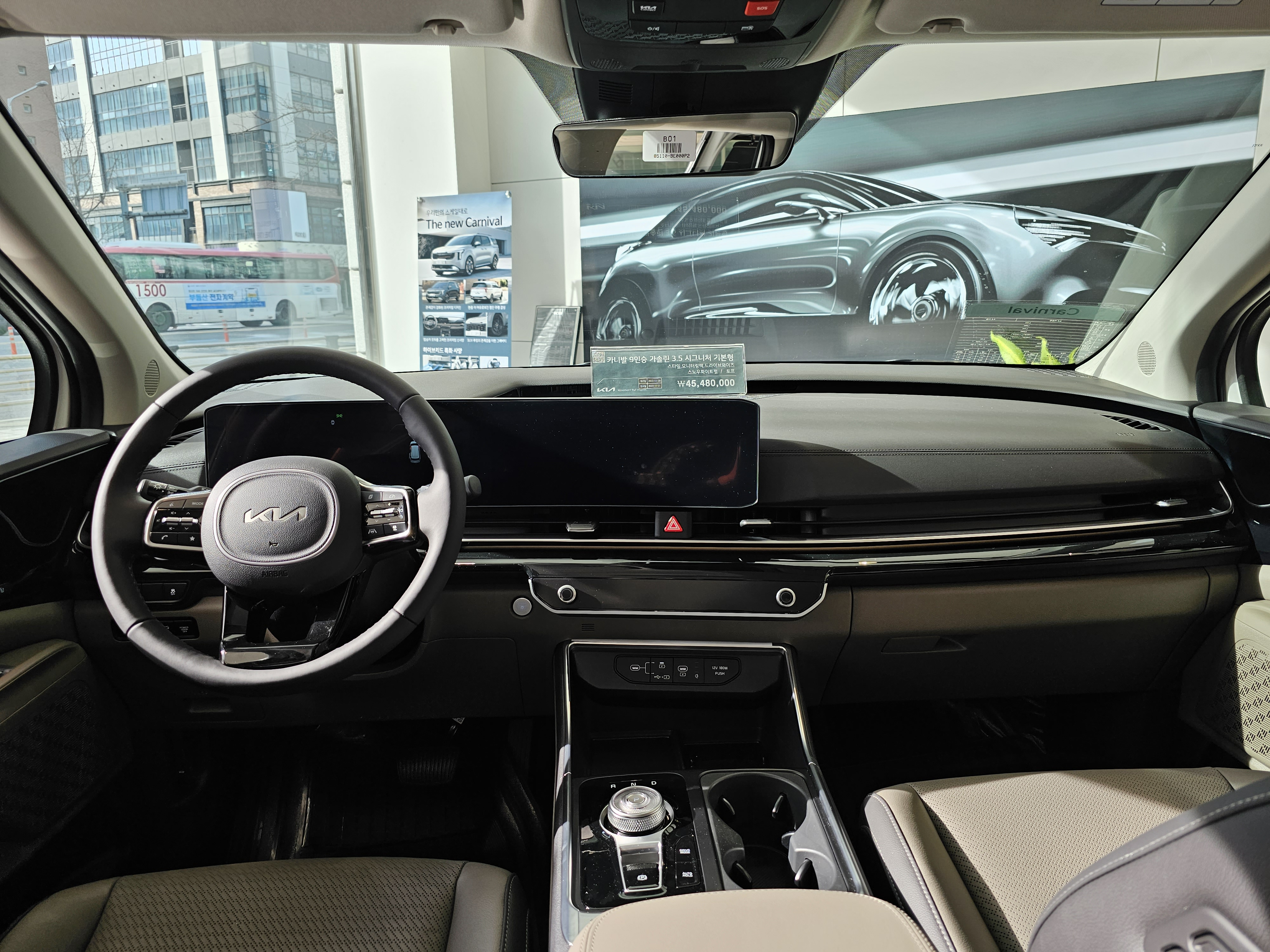
Interior (facelift)

=== Markets ===
==== Africa ====
===== South Africa =====
The fourth-generation Carnival was launched in South Africa on 25 January 2022, with four trim levels; EX, EX+, SX Limited and SXL. In South Africa, it comes in 7- and 8-seater configurations and with the 2.2-litre CRDi diesel engine.

The facelifted Carnival was launched on 8 August 2025, with two variants: EX (8-seater) and SXL (7-seater), powered by the 2.2-litre CRDi diesel engine.

==== Asia ====
===== China =====
The fourth-generation Carnival was introduced in China in September 2020 as an imported model, it is equipped with the 3.5-litre GDi petrol engine. It is locally assembled since September 2021 by using imported knock-down kits. The locally assembled Carnival is equipped with the locally built 2.0-litre T-GDi petrol engine.

===== India =====
The fourth-generation Carnival was launched on 3 October 2024 along with the EV9. It is available in two variants: Limousine and Limousine Plus; both variants comes in a 7-seater configuration and are powered by a 2.2-litre CRDi diesel engine. Prior to its launch, Kia received 2,796 bookings for the model.

===== Indonesia =====
The fourth-generation Carnival was launched in Indonesia on 11 November 2021 at the 28th Gaikindo Indonesia International Auto Show, with two trim levels available: Dynamic and Premiere. In Indonesia, it comes as 11-seater configuration and with the 2.2-litre CRDi diesel engine.

The facelifted Carnival was launched in Indonesia on 29 May 2024, with a new Premiere (7-seater) variant. The Hybrid powertrain option was later added in July 2024, as the first hybrid electric vehicle from Kia marketed in Indonesia.

===== Malaysia =====
The fourth-generation Carnival went on sale in Malaysia on 12 January 2022, as a sole variant in 11-seater configuration as a CBU model and with a sole 2.2-litre CRDi diesel engine option. In July 2022, the Carnival CKD versions was introduced and sold alongside the CBU version. There were three CKD variants: Mid (8-seater), High (8-seater), and High (7-seater). The Carnival 11-seater variant became locally assembled in November 2023.

The facelifted Carnival was launched in Malaysia on 15 January 2026, available with either 11- and 7-seater configurations, and powered by the sole 2.2-litre CRDi diesel engine. In April 2026, the 8-seater model using 2.2-litre CRDi diesel engine was reintroduced to the line-up.

Local assembly of the Carnival is locally assembled at the Inokom plant in Kulim, Kedah. In June 2026, Kia Malaysia announced that local assembly of the Carnival would move to Stellantis Malaysia's Gurun plant in the third quarter of 2026.

===== Pakistan =====
The fourth-generation Carnival was launched in Pakistan in December 2020, with two trim levels available at launch: GLS and GLS+. In Pakistan, the Carnival, like the previous generation, is solely offered with an 11 seat configuration due to Pakistan's tax systems as it falls under the commercial vehicle tax category. In 2022 a new trim level called the Executive was launched positioned above the GLS+ which mainly added ADAS, a 12.3" displays for both the central screen and the drivers display.

The facelifted Carnival was launched in December 2024 in just one unnamed trim level with all the equipment available in the Executive trim before. Only the 3.5-litre MPI V6 is available for this generation.

===== Philippines =====
The fourth-generation Carnival was launched in the Philippines on 17 February 2022, with two trim levels: EX and SX. In the Philippines, it comes as 8-seater configuration and with the 2.2-litre CRDi diesel engine.

The facelifted Carnival was launched in the Philippines on 20 September 2024, with the same trim levels and engine option from the pre-facelift model. Unlike the pre-facelift model, the facelift model variants comes with a 7-seater configuration. The Turbo HEV powertrain was later added for the SX trim in November 2024, as the first hybrid electric vehicle from Kia marketed in the Philippines. The Turbo HEV EX variant was added in March 2025.

===== Singapore =====
The fourth-generation Carnival was launched in Singapore on 29 April 2021, in the sole SX Tech Pack powered by the 2.2-litre CRDi diesel engine. In Singapore, the Carnival is available with 8 and 7-seater configurations.

The facelifted Carnival was launched in Singapore on 21 July 2024, it is available with 8-seater and 7-seater variants powered by the 1.6-litre T-GDi Hybrid turbocharged petrol.

===== Taiwan =====
The fourth-generation Carnival was launched in Taiwan on 13 April 2021, with four trim levels: Classic, Luxury, Premium, and Top Tier. In Taiwan, all trims come standard with the 7-seater configuration while the 8-seater configuration is optional for the Luxury and Premium trims. All variants are solely powered by the 2.2-litre CRDi diesel engine. In April 2024, the Space Edition model (8-seater) was made available limited to 100 units to celebrate Kia's 10th anniversary in Taiwan.

The facelifted Carnival was launched in Taiwan on 5 December 2024, with three trim levels: Trendy, Apex and Signature, powered by the 2.2-litre CRDi diesel engine. Unlike the pre-facelift model, all trims of the facelift model come standard with the 7-seater configuration. In September 2025, the 8-seater configuration was made available for the Apex and Signature trims.

===== Thailand =====
The fourth-generation Carnival was launched in Thailiand in November 2020. In Thailand, the Carnival comes in 11-seater configuration and with the 2.2-litre CRDi diesel engine. Three trim levels are available: Limited (later replaced by LX), EX and SXL. The SXL Luxury (7-seater) variant was added in March 2024.

The facelifted Carnival was launched in Thailand on 3 October 2025, with two trim levels: SXL Premium (7-seater) and SXL Luxury (7-seater), both variants are powered by the 1.6-litre T-GDi Hybrid turbocharged petrol.

===== Vietnam =====
The fourth-generation Carnival was launched in Vietnam on 9 October 2021, with three trim levels available: Luxury, Premium and Signature. For Vietnam, the Carnival comes in 7- and 8-seater configurations, and is offered with two engines: a 2.2-litre CRDi diesel and a 3.5-litre MPi V6 petrol. The Carnival is assembled by THACO for the Vietnamese market for all variants. Kia Vietnam however terms the Kia Carnival as a "city SUV" due to its SUV styling cues, despite it technically being an MPV.

The facelifted Carnival was launched in Vietnam on 16 September 2024, with the same trim levels from the pre-facelift model and the 3.5-litre MPi V6 petrol engine option was discontinued leaving only the 2.2-litre CRDi diesel as the sole engine option. The Turbo Hybrid Signature variant (7-seater) was later added in January 2025. In December 2025, the Turbo Hybrid Premium model available in three interior configurations was added to the line-up. In June 2026, the Turbo Hybrid Luxury variant (8-seater) was added to the line-up as an entry-level variant for the Hybrid model.

==== Latin America ====
===== Argentina =====
The fourth-generation Carnival was launched in Argentina on 31 March 2022, in the sole unnamed trim with an 11-seat configuration powered by a 2.2-litre CRDi diesel engine.

The facelifted Carnival was launched in Argentina on 2 October 2024, in the sole SX trim with an 11-seat configuration powered by a 2.2-litre CRDi diesel engine.

===== Brazil =====
The fourth-generation Carnival went on sale in Brazil on 5 August 2021, in the sole unnamed variant with an 8-seat configuration powered by a 3.5-litre MPi V6 petrol. In August 2023, the Carnival was temporarily discontinued in Brazil after only 23 units were sold during 2023.

The facelifted Carnival was launched in Brazil on 24 June 2024, after a temporary hiatus off sale in the Brazilian market. Like the pre-facelift model, the facelift model is available in the sole unnamed variant and uses the same engine option. In April 2026, the 1.6-litre T-GDi petrol hybrid was introduced in Brazil to replace the 3.5-litre MPi V6 petrol for the sole EX grade.

==== North America ====
The Sedona nameplate was introduced in the United States in 2001 and was used until the fourth generation, when Kia began using the Carnival nameplate globally. The fourth-generation model made its virtual US market debut on 23 February 2021 for the 2022 model year. In the US market, the 2022 Carnival is only offered with the 290hp (216kw; 294 PS) Smartstream G3.5 GDi V6 The Carnival went on sale in the U.S. and Canada starting March 2021 and is fully imported from South Korea for the North American market. The trim levels for the North American–spec Carnival were: LX, LX+ (Canada only), EX, EX+ (Canada only), SX, and SX Prestige (USA only). They come in either 7- or 8-seater configuration with the 7 seats offered on the base LX (without Seat Package) and 8-seater option is available on LX models with the Seat Package and is standard on the EX, SX and SX Prestige. On the SX Prestige the seating is reduced to 7 seats when equipped with the optional VIP Lounge Seating.

In February 2024, for the 2025 model year, the Carnival was updated with revamped styling and the Hybrid powertrain became available for the North American market alongside the existing 3.5-litre engine as well as a limited edition Dark Edition that features darker exterior trim.

==== Oceania ====
===== Australia =====
The fourth-generation Carnival went on sale in January 2021, with four trim levels: S, Si, SLi and Platinum. In Australia, the Carnival comes as 8-seater configuration and available with two engines: a 2.2-litre CRDi diesel and 3.5-litre MPi V6 petrol.

The facelifted Carnival was launched in Australia on 16 May 2024, with five trim levels: S, Sport, Sport+, GT Line Lite and GT Line. The facelift model saw the introduction of the Hybrid powertrain only for the GT Line trim. In May 2025, the Hybrid powertrain became available for the S and Sport+ trims.

The 3.5-litre V6 petrol was dropped from the range in 2026 to meet New Vehicle Efficiency Standard (NVES) emissions targets.

===== New Zealand =====
The fourth-generation Carnival was launched in New Zealand on 18 January 2021 with three trim levels, EX, Deluxe and Premium. All variants equipped with an eight-seat configuration and 2.2 litre CRDi diesel engine.

In February 2025, 1.6-litre turbo-petrol hybrid variant was introduced to the line-up.

==== Russia ====
In March 2021, the fourth-generation Carnival went on sale in Russia and other CIS markets. It was assembled in Kalingingrad by Avtotor in 7-seater and 8-seater configurations. Avtotor's assembly of Kia vehicles ended in 2022.

=== Powertrain ===
Specs
Model	Year	Transmission	Power	Torque	Acceleration 0–100 km/h (0–62 mph) (official)	Top speed
Petrol
Smartstream G2.0 T-GDi	2021–present	8-speed automatic	233 PS (171 kW; 230 hp) @ 6,000 rpm	36 kg⋅m (353 N⋅m; 260 lbf⋅ft) @ 1,500–4,000 rpm		
Smartstream G3.5 MPi	2020-present	8-speed automatic	272 PS (200 kW; 268 hp) @ 6,400 rpm	33.8 kg⋅m (331 N⋅m; 244 lbf⋅ft) @ 5,000 rpm	8.5s	190 km/h (118 mph)
Smartstream G3.5 GDi	2020-present	8-speed automatic	294 PS (216 kW; 290 hp) @ 6,400 rpm	36.2 kg⋅m (355 N⋅m; 262 lbf⋅ft) @ 5,200 rpm		
Hybrid
Smartstream G1.6 T-GDi Hybrid	2023–present	6-speed automatic	245 PS (180 kW; 242 hp)	37.4 kg⋅m (367 N⋅m; 271 lbf⋅ft)		
Diesel
Smartstream D2.2 CRDi	2020–present	8-speed automatic	202 PS (149 kW; 199 hp) @ 3,800 rpm	45.0 kg⋅m (441 N⋅m; 325 lbf⋅ft) @ 1,750–2,750 rpm	10.7s	190 km/h (118 mph)

=== Safety ===
In the United States, the Insurance Institute for Highway Safety (IIHS) rates the Carnival Good in the small overlap front test (2022~2026 models), Marginal in the updated moderate overlap front test (2023~2026 models). Beginning with 2025 models, structural reinforcements were added to the B-pillar, front and rear doors and rear seat rails.

ANCAP test results Kia Carnival all variants (2021, aligned with Euro NCAP)
Test	Points	%
Overall:	5 /5 stars	
Adult occupant:	34.54	90%
Child occupant:	43.52	88%
Pedestrian:	36.91	68%
Safety assist:	13.23	82%

IIHS scores (2026)
IIHS scores	Rating
small overlap front	Good
Moderate overlap front (updated test)	Marginal
Side (updated test)	Acceptable
Seat belt reminders	Acceptable
LATCH ease of use	Acceptable

== Future developments ==
In October 2026, Kia confirmed that the next-generation Carnival will include a hydrogen fuel cell electric vehicle (FCEV) variant, scheduled to begin commercial production in 2029 at Gwangmyeong Plant 1 near Seoul.

According to reporting from Dong-A Ilbo, Kia reached an agreement with its trade union through the Employment Stability Committee to manufacture the fuel-cell model as part of new vehicle programs planned for 2027–2029.

The hydrogen-powered Carnival is expected to use Kia's next-generation fuel-cell system, potentially related to technology deployed in Hyundai's latest Nexo model, and will follow the new-generation Carnival scheduled for release in 2028.

== Sales ==
Calendar year	United States (Note: Figures based on Kia America total model sales (United States))	South Korea (Note: Figures based on the Domestic column of Kia's Sales by Model report (wholesale basis) (South Korea))	Australia (Note: Figures based on new-vehicle deliveries reported through VFACTS (Australia))	Malaysia (Note: Figures based on registration (Malaysia))		China (Note: Figures based on Yiche terminal sales (China))	Indonesia (Note: Figures based on GAIKINDO wholesale sales (Indonesia))	
Calendar year	United States	South Korea	Australia	Kia Carnival	Naza Ria	China	Kia Carnival	Kia Sedona
1998		57,205						—N/a
1999		100,000						—N/a
2000		58,456		325			3,414	—N/a
2001	15,069	72,476		556			1,656	—N/a
2002	39,088	64,321		964			583	—N/a
2003	50,628	36,164		511	3,788		547	—N/a
2004	61,149	19,315		10	11,366		316	—N/a
2005	52,837	14,433		1	10,072		—N/a	251
2006	57,018	19,732		1	3,765		—N/a	77
2007	40,493	20,489		0	2,337		—N/a	45
2008	26,915	19,174		0	1,356		—N/a	27
2009	27,398	21,377		0	1,569		—N/a	23
2010	21,823	25,144		2	173		—N/a	—N/a
2011	24,047	27,091		0	5		—N/a	—N/a
2012	17,512	30,712	3,676	1	0		—N/a	—N/a
2013	7,079	30,586		0	0		—N/a	—N/a
2014	14,567	41,643	2,552	0	0		—N/a	—N/a
2015	36,755	67,560	3,638	0	0		—N/a	—N/a
2016	28,264	65,927	4,777	0	0		—N/a	25
2017	23,814	68,386	5,878	595	0		—N/a	90
2018	17,928	76,362	6,610	709	0		—N/a	24
2019	15,931	63,706	6,493	736	1		—N/a	N/A
2020	13,190	64,195	3,650	282			—N/a	49
2021	25,155	73,503	5,862	219			11	18
2022	19,706	59,058	8,054	1,342			246	—N/a
2023	43,687	69,857	11,312	2,190		1,904	139	—N/a
2024	49,726	82,748	10,080	1,173		1,828	183	—N/a
2025	71,917	78,218	10,948	412		1,133	32 (inc. 12 HEV)	—N/a
