= Kia Cadenza =

Full-size executive car produced by Kia (2009-2021)

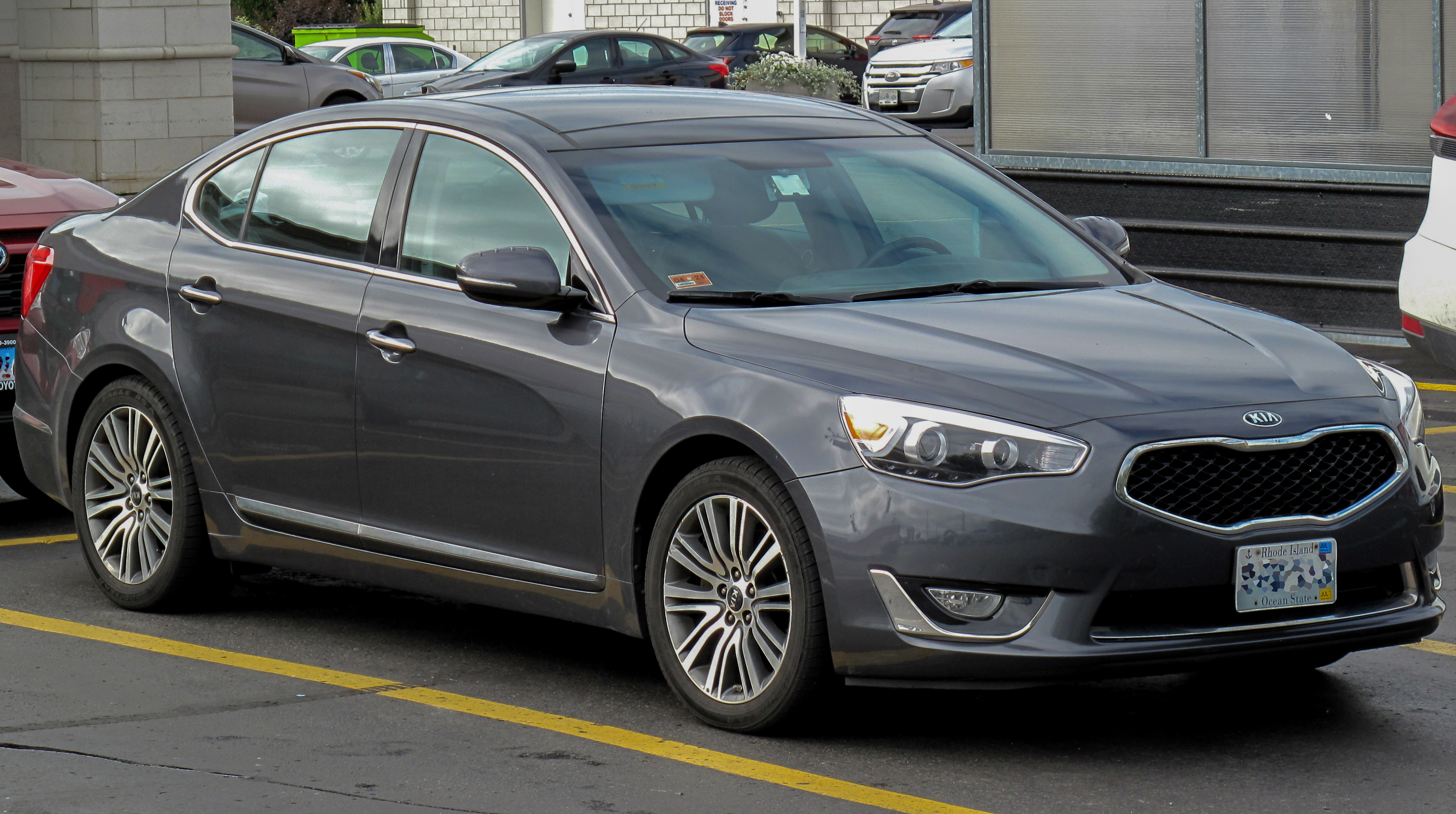

Overview
- Manufacturer: Kia
- Also called: Kia K7 (South Korea)
- Production: 2009–2021

Body and chassis
- Class: Full-size car/Executive car (E)
- Body style: 4-door sedan
- Layout: Front-engine, front-wheel-drive
- Related: Hyundai Grandeur; Hyundai Aslan

Chronology
- Predecessor: Kia Amanti/Opirus
- Successor: Kia K8

The Kia Cadenza, also known in South Korea as Kia K7 (Korean: 기아 K7) is a full-size/executive car manufactured by Kia, produced from 2009 to 2021. It was first launched in 2009 to replace the Opirus/Amanti.

As of January 2014, it was sold in South Korea, United States, Canada, China, Colombia, Brazil, Chile, and the Middle East. A total of four engines were offered as options for the Cadenza, including the 2.4L Theta II MPI engine, 2.7L Mu MPI engine, 2.7L Mu LPI engine, and 3.5L Lambda II MPI engine, with a 6-speed automatic transmission as the gearbox.

== First generation (VG; 2009) ==
First generation (VG)
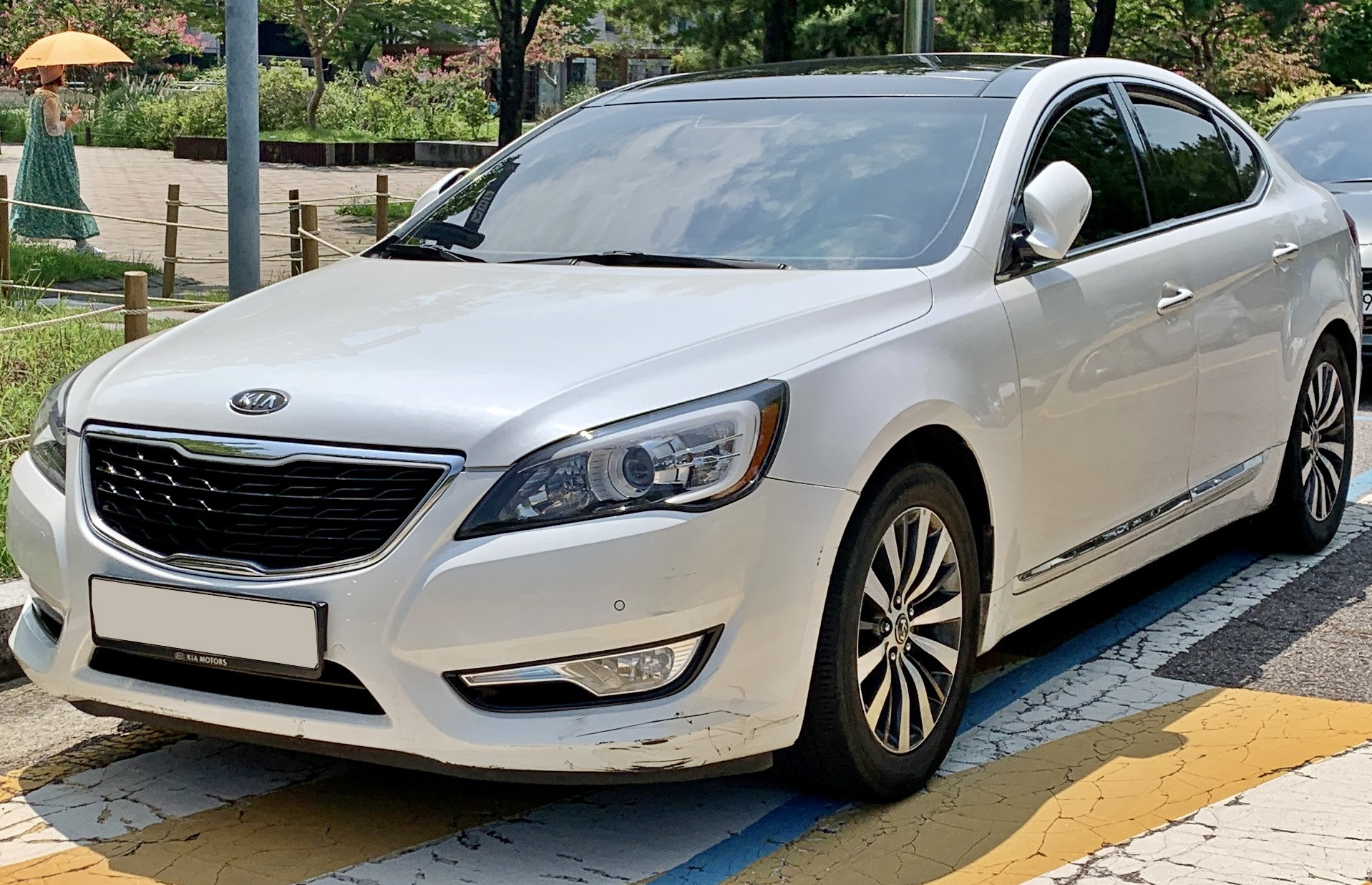
- Kia K7 (pre-facelift)

Overview
- Production: 2009–2016
- Model years: 2010–2016
- Assembly: South Korea: Hwasung (Hwasung Plant); Kazakhstan: Oskemen (Azia Avto)
- Designer: Peter Schreyer

Body and chassis
- Related: Hyundai Grandeur

Powertrain
- Engine: Petrol: 2.4L Theta II MPI I4; 2.4L Theta II GDI I4; 2.7L Mu MPI V6; 3.0L Lambda GDI V6; 3.3L Lambda GDI V6; 3.5L Lambda MPI V6; LPG: 2.7L Mu LPI V6; 3.0L Lambda LPI V6
- Transmission: 6-speed automatic

Dimensions
- Wheelbase: 2,845 mm (112.0 in)
- Length: 4,965 mm (195.5 in)
- Width: 1,850 mm (72.8 in)
- Height: 1,475 mm (58.1 in)
- Curb weight: 1,505–1,690 kg (3,318–3,726 lb)

The Cadenza uses the new front-wheel-drive Type-N platform with MacPherson front suspension and a multilink rear suspension. The Cadenza was offered with three gasoline engines ranging from 165 horsepower to 290 horsepower for the 3.5-liter Lambda. A new 2.4-liter Theta II with gasoline direct injection (GDI) that produced 201 horsepower was also available. A hybrid K7 700h was available in Korea, featuring a 159 hp four cylinder engine and a 35 kW electric motor.

The Kia Cadenza was designed by Kia design chief Peter Schreyer who was chief designer at Audi and uses Kia's corporate Tiger Nose grille.

In January 2013, Kia announced that the Cadenza will be available in the United States. It is Kia's version of the Hyundai Azera. Standard features will include leather seats, Bluetooth, a navigation system, Kia UVO, alloy wheels, and other luxury car features. This was one of five Korean luxury sedans sold in the United States at the time, the other four cars being the Hyundai Azera, Hyundai Genesis, Kia K900 and Hyundai Equus.

The car features Nappa leather seats, a feature commonly found on more expensive vehicles such as those from BMW and Mercedes-Benz. The Nappa leather is available in three colors: black, beige, or white (the white interior requires all three packages available on the Cadenza: the Luxury, Technology, and White Interior Packages). The driver's seat is both heated and ventilated, and the passenger's seat is heated. The rear seats can also be heated. A dual sunroof is available. The car features the 3.3L, 294 horsepower V6, the most powerful engine available for the Cadenza. The engine is used in the Cadenza's platform mate, the Hyundai Azera, and is a Hyundai-built engine from the Lambda engine family.

=== Powertrain ===
Model	Year	Transmission	Power	Torque
Petrol
Theta II 2.4 MPI	2009–2011	6-speed automatic	180 PS (132 kW; 178 hp) @ 6,000 rpm	23.5 kg⋅m (230 N⋅m; 170 lbf⋅ft) @ 4,000 rpm
Theta II 2.4 MPI Hybrid	2013–2016	6-speed automatic	200 PS (147 kW; 197 hp) @ 5,500 rpm	
Theta II 2.4 GDI	2011–2016	6-speed automatic	201 PS (148 kW; 198 hp) @ 6,300 rpm	25.5 kg⋅m (250 N⋅m; 184 lbf⋅ft) @ 4,250 rpm
Mu 2.7 MPI	2009–2011	6-speed automatic	200 PS (147 kW; 197 hp) @ 6,000 rpm	26 kg⋅m (255 N⋅m; 188 lbf⋅ft) @ 4,500 rpm
Lambda II 3.0 GDI	2011–2016	6-speed automatic	270 PS (199 kW; 266 hp) @ 6,400 rpm	31.6 kg⋅m (310 N⋅m; 229 lbf⋅ft) @ 5,300 rpm
Lambda II 3.3 GDI	2011–2016	6-speed automatic	294 PS (216 kW; 290 hp) @ 6,400 rpm	35.3 kg⋅m (346 N⋅m; 255 lbf⋅ft) @ 5,200 rpm
Lambda II 3.5 MPI	2009–2016	6-speed automatic	290 PS (213 kW; 286 hp) @ 6,600 rpm	34.5 kg⋅m (338 N⋅m; 250 lbf⋅ft) @ 5,000 rpm
LPG
Mu 2.7 LPI	2009–2011	6-speed automatic	165 PS (121 kW; 163 hp) @ 5,200 rpm	25 kg⋅m (245 N⋅m; 181 lbf⋅ft) @ 4,000 rpm
Lambda II 3.0 LPI	2011–2016	6-speed automatic	235 PS (173 kW; 232 hp) @ 6,000 rpm	28.6 kg⋅m (280 N⋅m; 207 lbf⋅ft) @ 4,500 rpm

=== Gallery ===
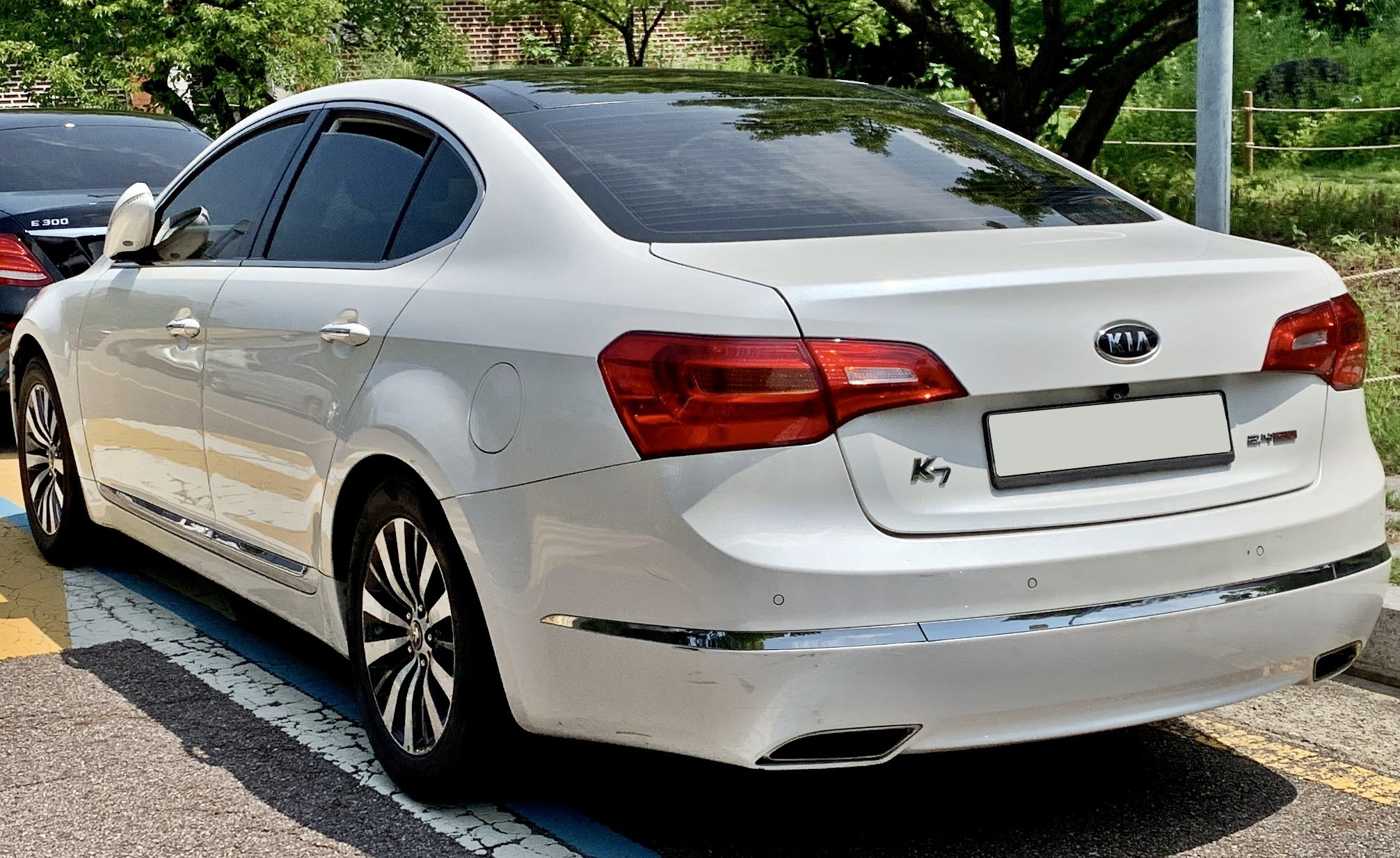
Kia K7 (pre-facelift)

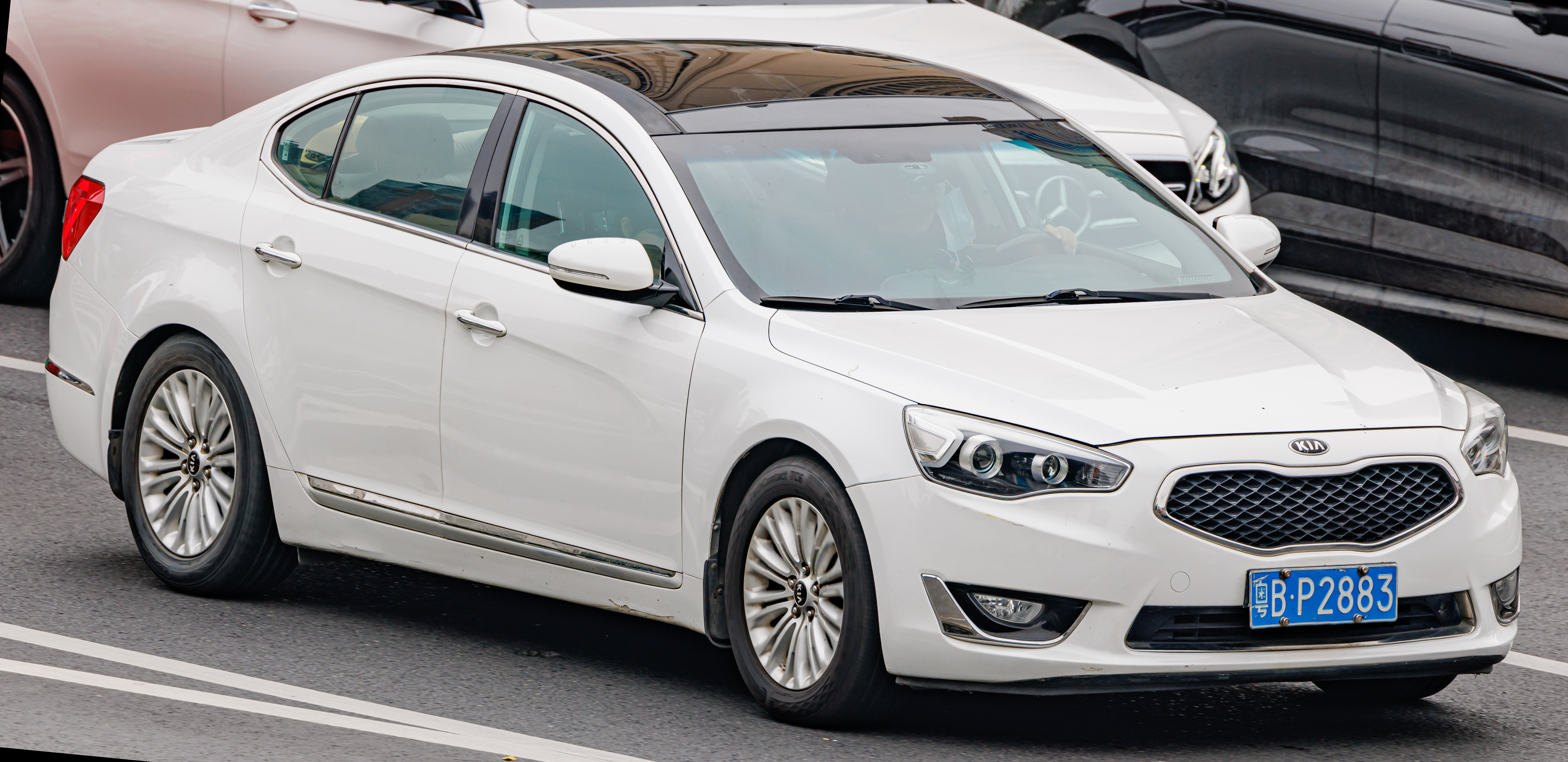
Kia Cadenza (facelift) (China)

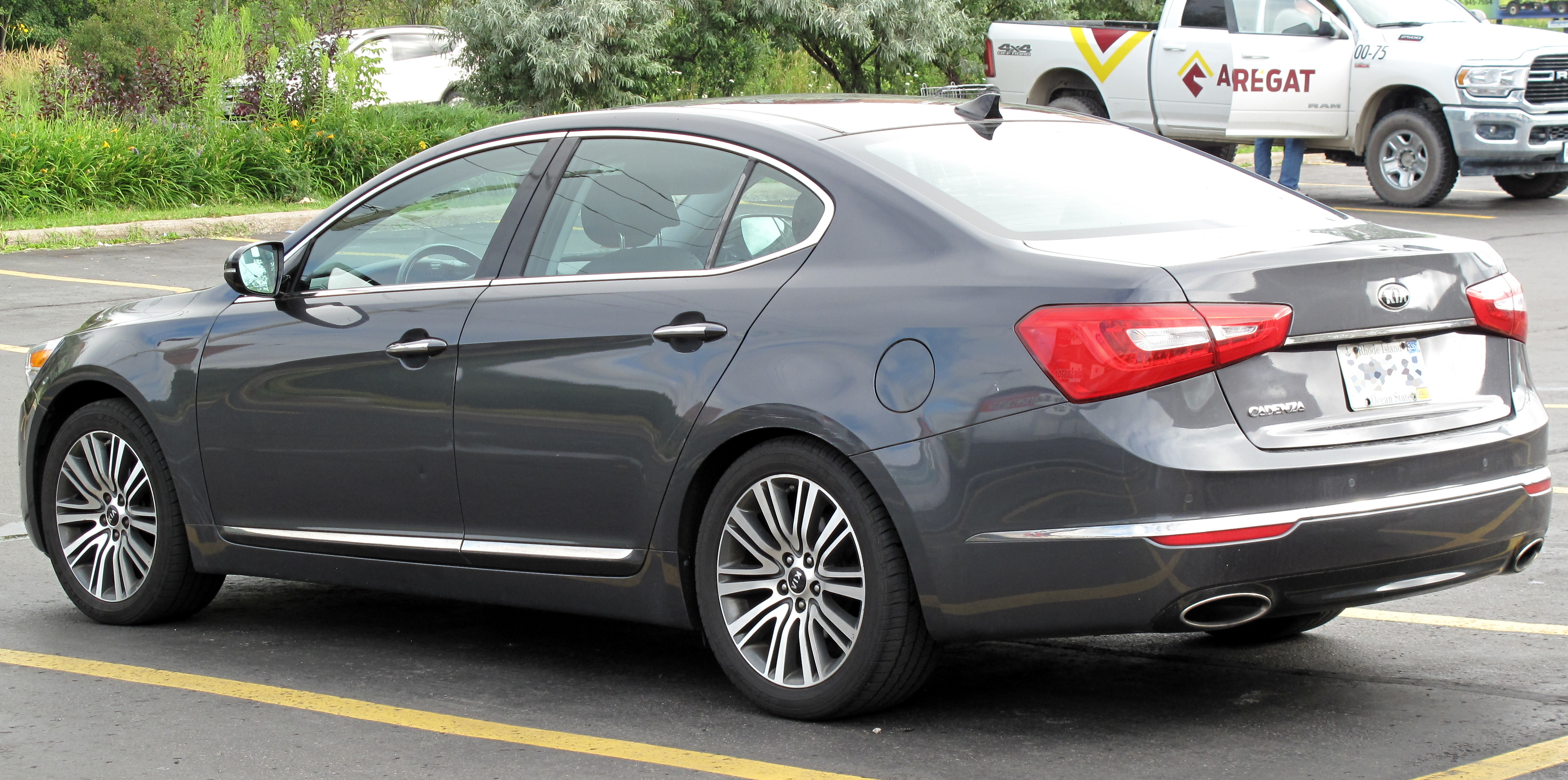
Kia Cadenza (facelift) (US)

== Second generation (YG; 2016) ==
Second generation (YG)
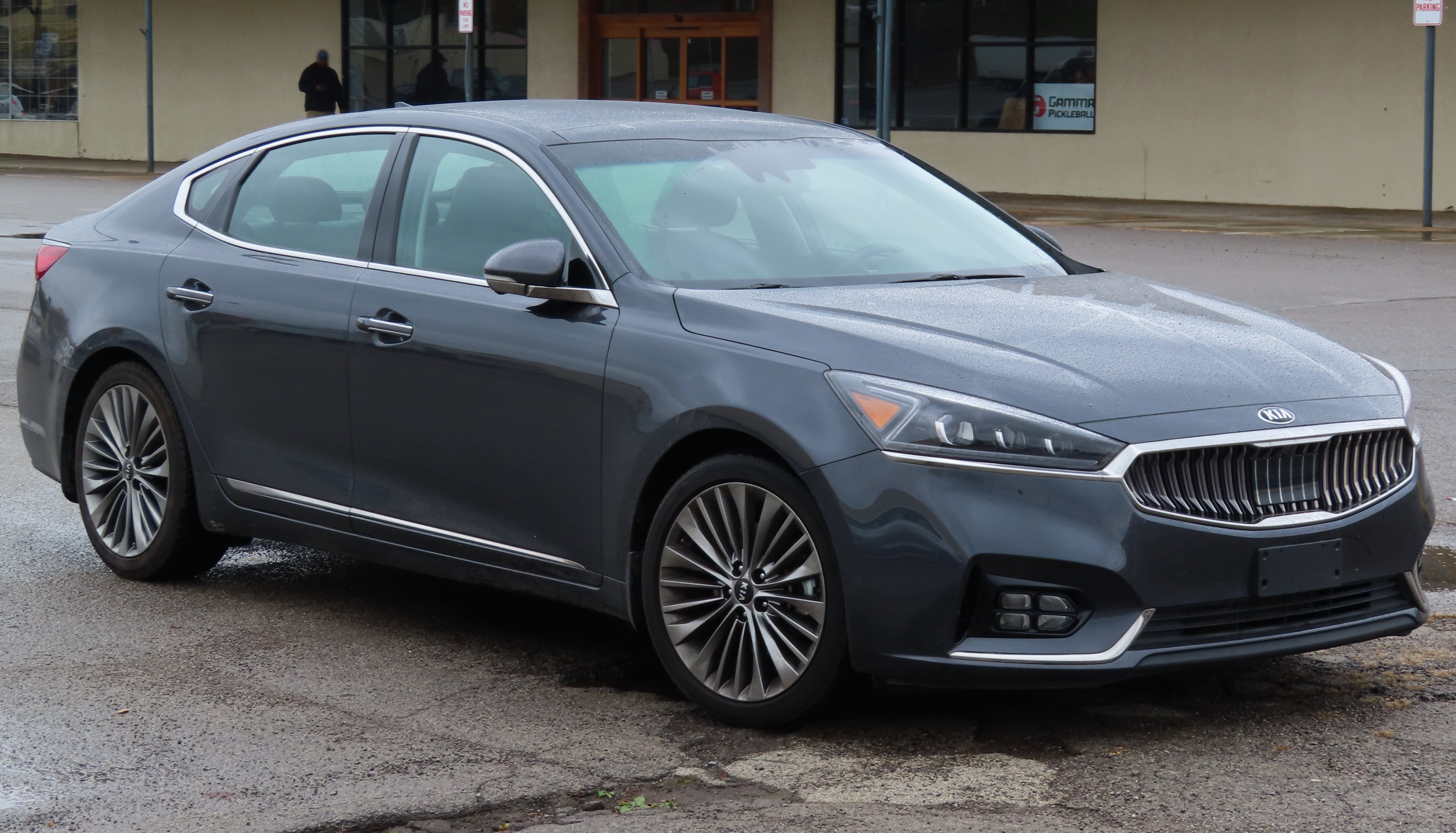
- 2019 Kia Cadenza Limited

Overview
- Production: 2016–2021
- Model years: 2017–2020 (North America); 2017–2021 (Middle East)
- Assembly: South Korea: Hwasung (Hwasung Plant)
- Designer: Peter Schreyer

Body and chassis
- Related: Hyundai Grandeur

Powertrain
- Engine: Petrol: 2.4L Theta II GDI I4; 2.5L Smartstream GDI I4; 3.0L Lambda II GDI V6; 3.3L Lambda II MPI V6; 3.3L Lambda II GDI V6; 3.5L Lambda II MPI V6; Hybrid petrol: 2.4L Theta II MPI I4; LPG: 3.0L Lambda II LPI V6; Diesel: 2.2L R II CRDi I4
- Electric motor: 38kW permanent magnet high-power density motor
- Transmission: 6-speed automatic 8-speed automatic
- Battery: 1.76 kWh Li-ion Polymer

Dimensions
- Wheelbase: 2,855 mm (112.4 in)
- Length: 4,970 mm (195.7 in) (pre-facelift); 4,995 mm (196.7 in) (facelift)
- Width: 1,870 mm (73.6 in)
- Height: 1,470 mm (57.9 in)
- Curb weight: 1,555–1,730 kg (3,428–3,814 lb)

Released in Fall 2016, the second-generation Kia Cadenza was redesigned by Peter Schreyer. The car is offered with a revised 3.3-liter V6 that generates 290 horsepower (294 PS; 216 kW). Aside from the 6-speed automatic, the Cadenza is offered with a new in-house developed 8-speed automatic with a drive mode select system.

=== 2019 update ===
The Cadenza received a facelift in June 2019. Mechanical changes include a new 2.5L SmartStream G engine replacing the 2.4L Theta II GDI engine, while the 3.5L Lambda II MPI engine replaces the 3.3L Lambda II GDI engine in some regions. For styling, the update includes a new grille and hood, new front and rear bumpers, a new wheel design, and a new 12.3-inch infotainment touchscreen.

=== Powertrain ===
Model	Year	Transmission	Power	Torque
Petrol
Theta II 2.4 GDI	2016–2019	6-speed automatic	190 PS (140 kW; 187 hp) @ 6,000 rpm	24.6 kg⋅m (241 N⋅m; 178 lbf⋅ft) @ 4,000 rpm
Smartstream G2.5 GDI	2019–2021	8-speed automatic	198 PS (146 kW; 195 hp) @ 6,100 rpm	25.3 kg⋅m (248 N⋅m; 183 lbf⋅ft) @ 4,000 rpm
Lambda II 3.0 GDI	2018–2021	8-speed automatic	266 PS (196 kW; 262 hp) @ 6,400 rpm	31.4 kg⋅m (308 N⋅m; 227 lbf⋅ft) @ 5,300 rpm
Lambda II 3.3 MPI	2016–2019	6-speed automatic	270 PS (199 kW; 266 hp) @ 6,400 rpm	32.4 kg⋅m (318 N⋅m; 234 lbf⋅ft) @ 4,500 rpm
Lambda II 3.3 GDI	2016–2021	8-speed automatic	284 PS (209 kW; 280 hp) @ 6,400 rpm 294 PS (216 kW; 290 hp) @ 6,400 rpm	34.3 kg⋅m (336 N⋅m; 248 lbf⋅ft) @ 5,200 rpm 35 kg⋅m (343 N⋅m; 253 lbf⋅ft) @ 5,200 rpm
Lambda II 3.5 MPI	2020–2021	8-speed automatic	290 PS (213 kW; 286 hp) @ 6,600 rpm	34.5 kg⋅m (338 N⋅m; 250 lbf⋅ft) @ 5,000 rpm
Hybrid
Theta II 2.4 MPI Hybrid	2016–2021	6-speed automatic	200 PS (147 kW; 197 hp) @ 5,500 rpm	
LPG
Lambda II 3.0 LPI	2016–2021	6-speed automatic	235 PS (173 kW; 232 hp) @ 6,000 rpm	28.6 kg⋅m (280 N⋅m; 207 lbf⋅ft) @ 4,500 rpm
Diesel
R II 2.2 CRDI	2016–2020	8-speed automatic	202 PS (149 kW; 199 hp) @ 3,800 rpm	45 kg⋅m (441 N⋅m; 325 lbf⋅ft) @ 1,750–2,750 rpm

=== Safety ===
The Cadenza received a "Top Safety Pick+" rating from the Insurance Institute for Highway Safety (IIHS).

Test	Rating
Overall:	5/5 stars
Small overlap front:	Good
Moderate overlap front:	Good
Side:	Good
Roof strength:	Good
Head restraints & seats:	Good
Front crash prevention:	Superior
Headlights:	Acceptable
Child seat anchors (Latch) ease of use:	Marginal

=== Gallery ===
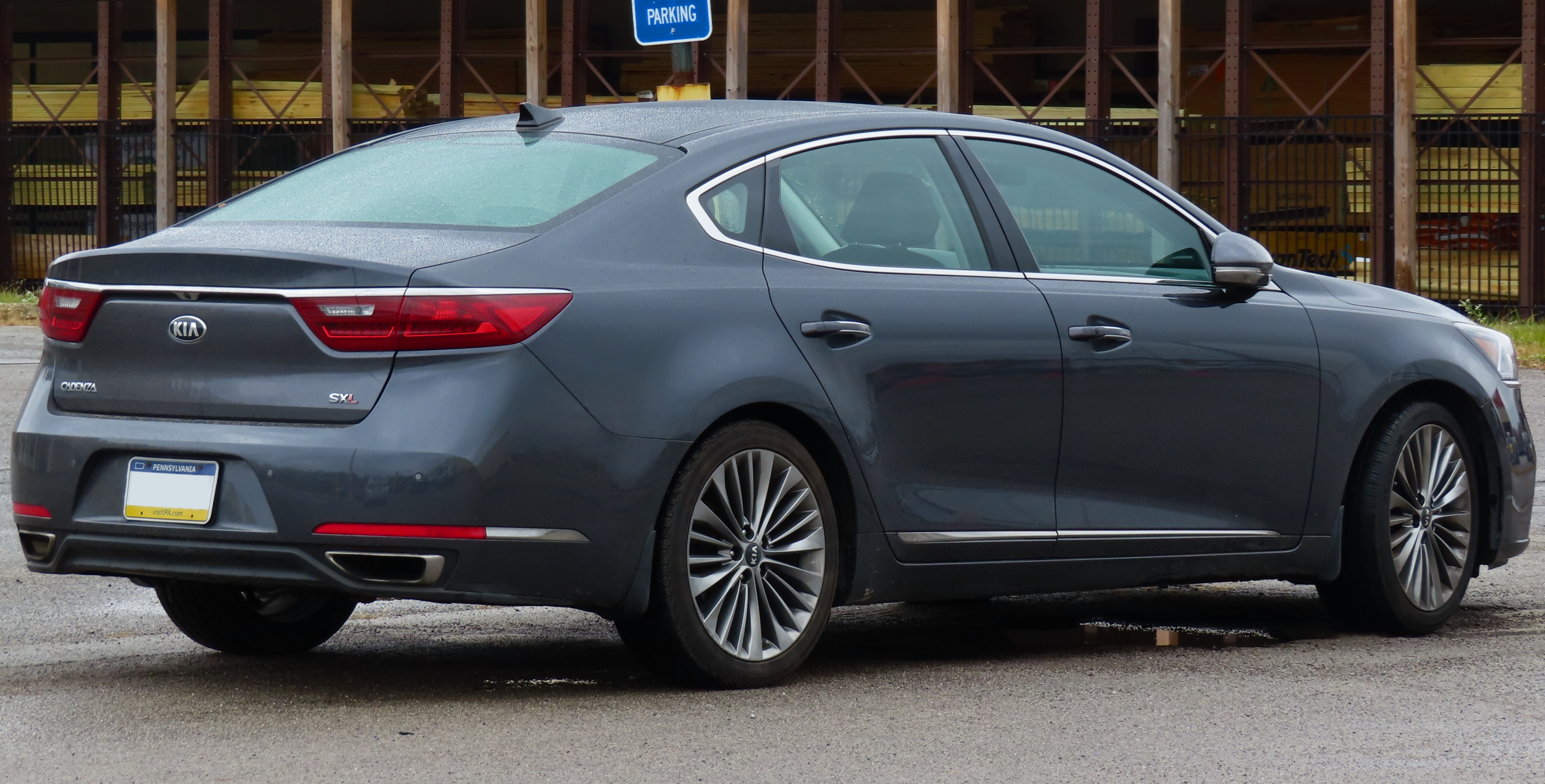
Rear view

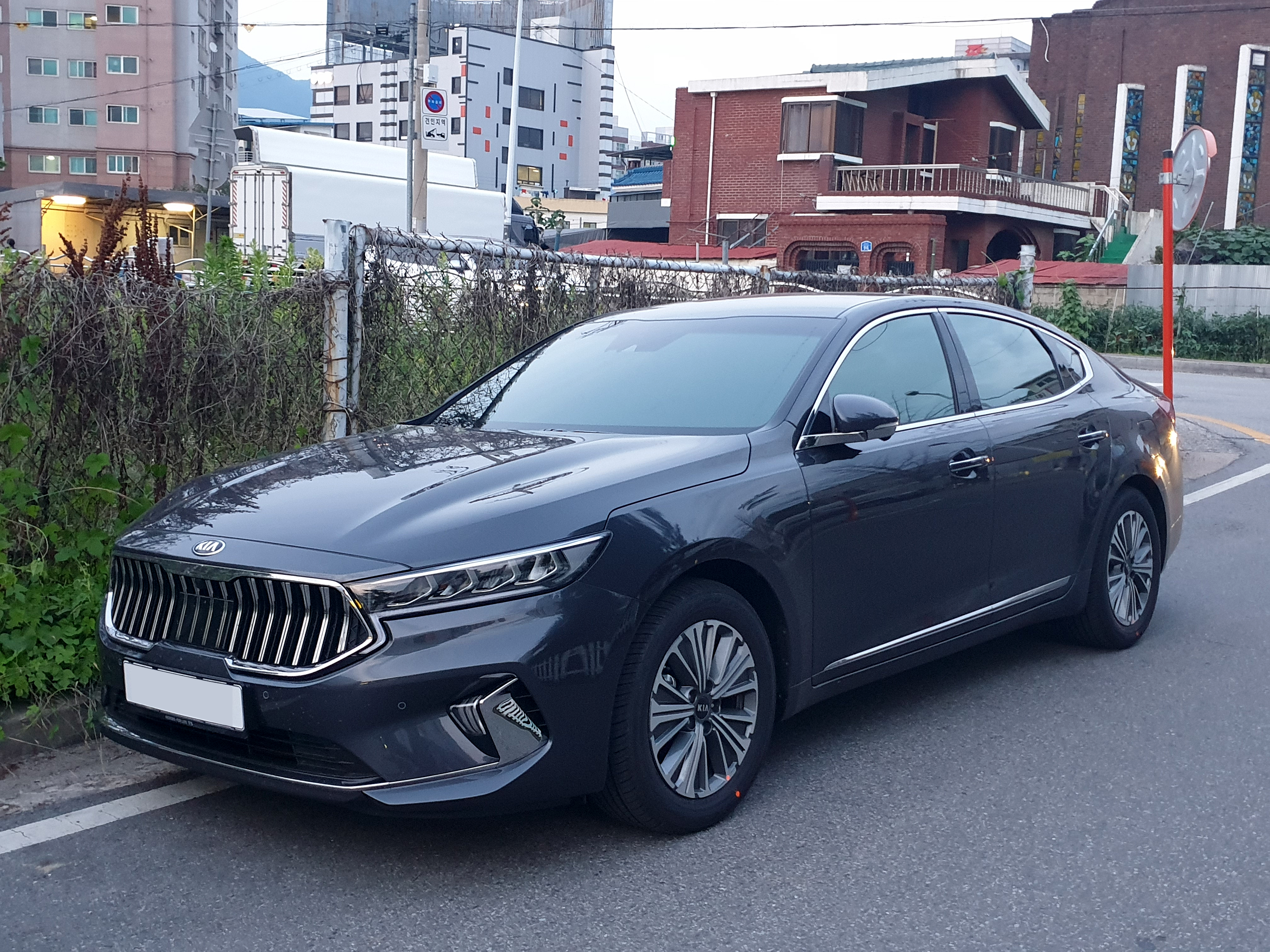
K7 facelift front (South Korea)

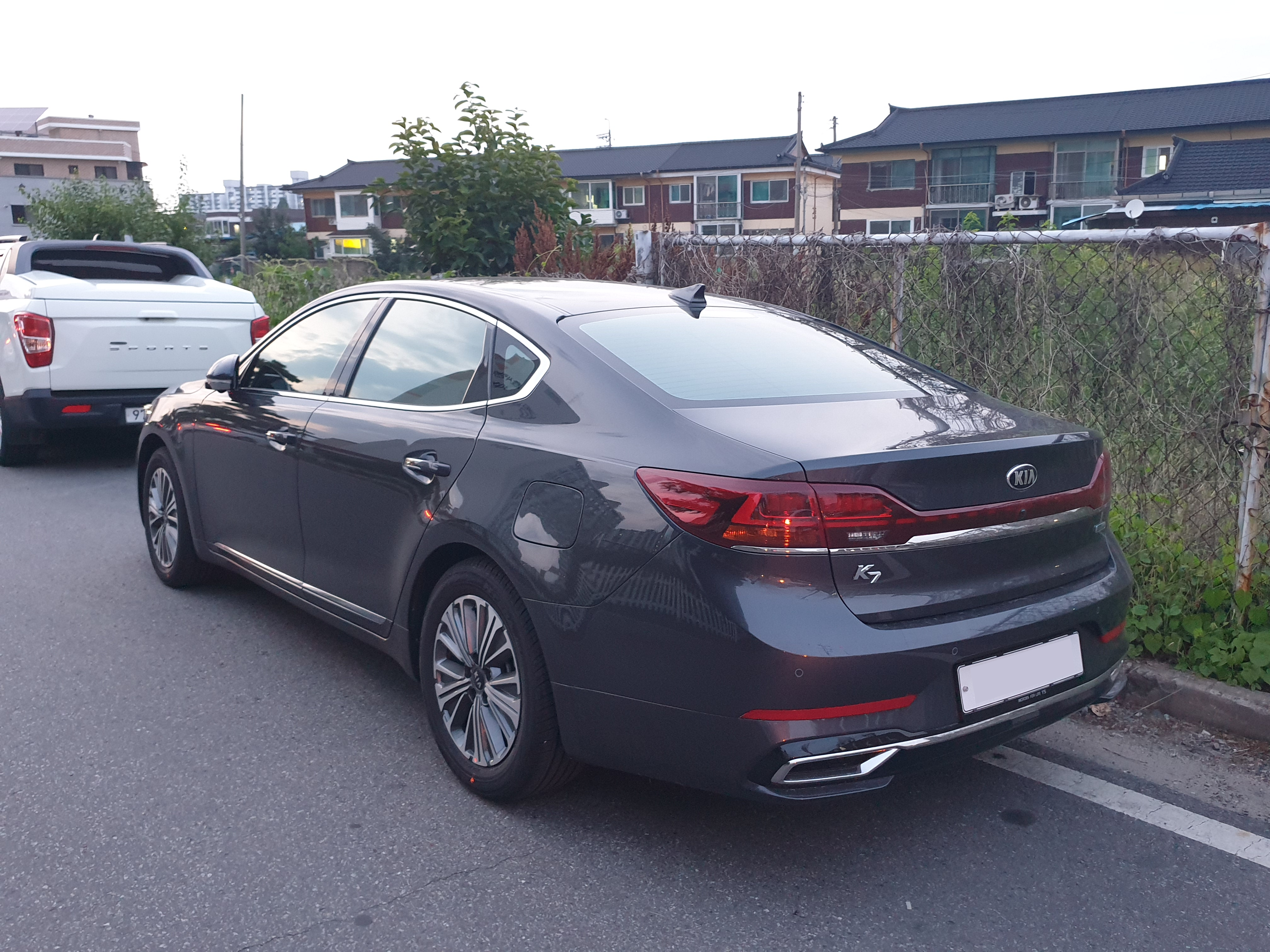
K7 facelift rear (South Korea)

== Discontinuation ==
The Cadenza was discontinued in Canada after the 2019 model year, and in the US after the 2020 model year. Kia cited the market transition from large cars to crossovers and SUVs.

Production of the Cadenza ended in early 2021 after 12 years to make way for a new model, the K8.

== Sales ==
Calendar year	South Korea	United States
2010	42,544	—N/a
2011	23,708	—N/a
2012	20,169	—N/a
2013	25,330	8,626
2014	22,453	9,267
2015	20,805	7,343
2016	56,060	4,738
2017	46,578	7,249
2018	40,978	4,507
2019	55,839	1,630
2020	41,048	1,265
2021	6,143	249
2022		1
