= Peter Schreyer =

German automobile designer (born 1953)

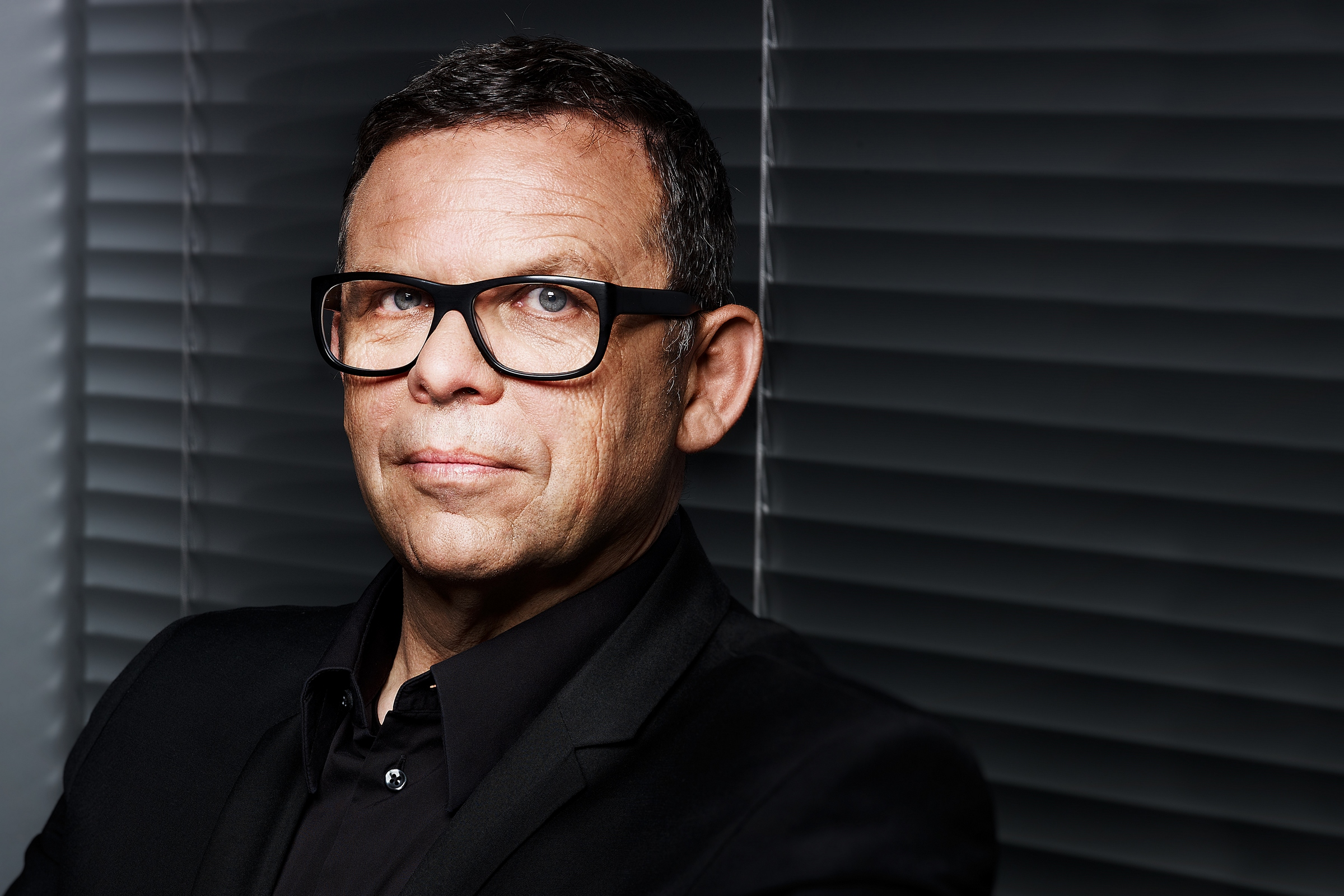
- Born: 1953 (age 72–73); Bad Reichenhall, Bavaria, West Germany
- Education: Munich University of Applied Sciences; Royal College of Art
- Engineering career
- Projects: Projects for Volkswagen Group (including Audi) and Hyundai Motor Group (including Kia)
- Significant design: Audi TT; Kia Kee; Kia Soul

Peter Schreyer (born 1953) is a German automobile designer widely known for his design contributions to the Audi TT. He was the chief design officer at Kia Motors from 2006–2018 and, on 28 December 2012, he was named one of three presidents of the company.

Schreyer is known for wearing all-black clothing, black eyeglasses designed by Philippe Starck, and for his "competitive, inventive and analytic" nature.

== Education and early career ==
Schreyer was born in 1953 in Bad Reichenhall, Bavaria, West Germany, and he began studying in 1975 at the Munich University of Applied Sciences (Fachhochschule München – Industrie Design). He worked with Audi first as a student in 1978, graduating in 1979 with his industrial design degree. Subsequently, he won the Audi Scholarship to study at the Royal College of Art in London from 1979 to 1980 as a transportation design student.

== Audi and Volkswagen Group ==
In 1980, Schreyer began working with Audi in exterior, interior and conceptual design. In 1991, he moved to the company's design studio in California. He returned to the Audi Design Concept Studio in 1992 and, the following year, moved to Volkswagen's exterior design department.

As head of design and working in collaboration with designer Freeman Thomas and the Audi design team, Schreyer created the Audi TT. Initially released as a concept study at the International Motor Show Germany (IAA) in Frankfurt in 1995, the car entered series production and was released to the market in 1998. In 1999 it was voted best new car of the year by Auto Europe. In 2006, Car Design News called the Audi TT one of "the most influential automotive designs in recent time".

== Kia and Hyundai Motor Group ==
"I try to look at architecture and art and music, things like this. I like things that are not average, and people who follow their own vision."

— Peter Schreyer, discussing his design influences in 2009

Beginning in 2005, Kia focused on the European market, identifying design as central to their growth strategy — leading to the 2006 hiring of Schreyer as chief design officer. Schreyer oversaw design activities at Kia's design centers in Frankfurt, Irvine, Tokyo and the Namyang Design Center in Korea, and was central to a complete restyling of Kia's range and market positioning.

Schreyer indicated in a 2010 interview that Kia had a "neutral image" - indistinguishable whether it was Korean or Japanese - and said that "it's very important that you are able to recognise a Kia at first sight".

The Kee concept vehicle, shown at the 2007 Frankfurt Motor Show, introduced a new corporate grille to create a recognizable 'face' for the brand. Known as the Tiger Nose, Schreyer indicated he wanted "a powerful visual signal, a seal, an identifier. The front of a car needs this recognition, this expression. A car needs a face and I think the new Kia face is strong and distinctive. Visibility is vital and that face should immediately allow you to identify a Kia even from a distance". Commenting on the new signature grille in 2009, Schreyer said "Tigers are powerful, yet kind of friendly". The nose is "three-dimensional - like a face, not just a surface with a mouth drawn on it. From now on, we'll have it on all our cars".

In November 2018 Schreyer was replaced by Luc Donckerwolke as the chief design officer at Hyundai-Kia; Schreyer's title was updated to "President and head of design management for Hyundai Motor Group", responsible for the group's long-term design vision.

He retired from his full-time role at the company at the end of 2023, but continues to support the organization's partnerships with educational institutions such as the Royal College of Art and initiatives such as the Hyundai-Kia Student Awards.

== Awards ==
- 1995 Schreyer founded and juried the "Internationaler Audi design Förderpreis".
- 2003 Design Award of the Federal Republic of Germany.
- 2007 honorary doctorate from the Royal College of Art in London, following Sergio Pininfarina and Giorgetto Giugiaro as only the third automotive designer to receive the honor.
- 2013 Das Goldene Lenkrad - Goldene Ehrenlenkrad award (Auto Bild & Bild-am-Sonntag)
- 2014 Grand Prix du Design, 29th Festival Automobile International de Paris
- 2014 EyesOn Design Lifetime Design Achievement award.

== Design work ==
- Audi
  - Audi A3 (1996)
  - Audi A4 (2000)
  - Audi A6 (1997)
  - Audi TT (1998)
- Volkswagen
  - Volkswagen Concept R (2003)
  - Volkswagen Eos (2006)
  - Volkswagen Golf (1997)
  - Volkswagen New Beetle (1997)
- Kia
  - Kia Borrego (2008)
  - Kia Cadenza (2010)
  - Kia Cadenza (2017)
  - Kia Carnival (2015)
  - Kia Cee'd (2012)
  - Kia Ceed (2018)
  - Kia Forte (2012)
  - Kia Forte (2018)
  - Kia K9 (2012)
  - Kia K9 (2018)
  - Kia Niro (2017)
  - Kia Optima (2010)
  - Kia Optima (2015)
  - Kia Picanto (2011)
  - Kia Picanto (2017)
  - Kia Rio (2011)
  - Kia Rio (2017)
  - Kia Sorento (2009)
  - Kia Soul (2014)
  - Kia Sportage (2010)
  - Kia Sportage (2015)
  - Kia Stinger (2017)
  - Kia Stonic (2017)
  - Kia Venga (2009)
- Hyundai Motor Company
  - Hyundai Genesis (2014)
  - Hyundai i30 (2017)
  - Hyundai Tucson (2015)
- Genesis Motor
  - Genesis G70 (2017)
  - Genesis G80 (2016)
  - Genesis G90 (2015)
