= Kia K9 =

Full-size luxury car produced by Kia (2012-2026)

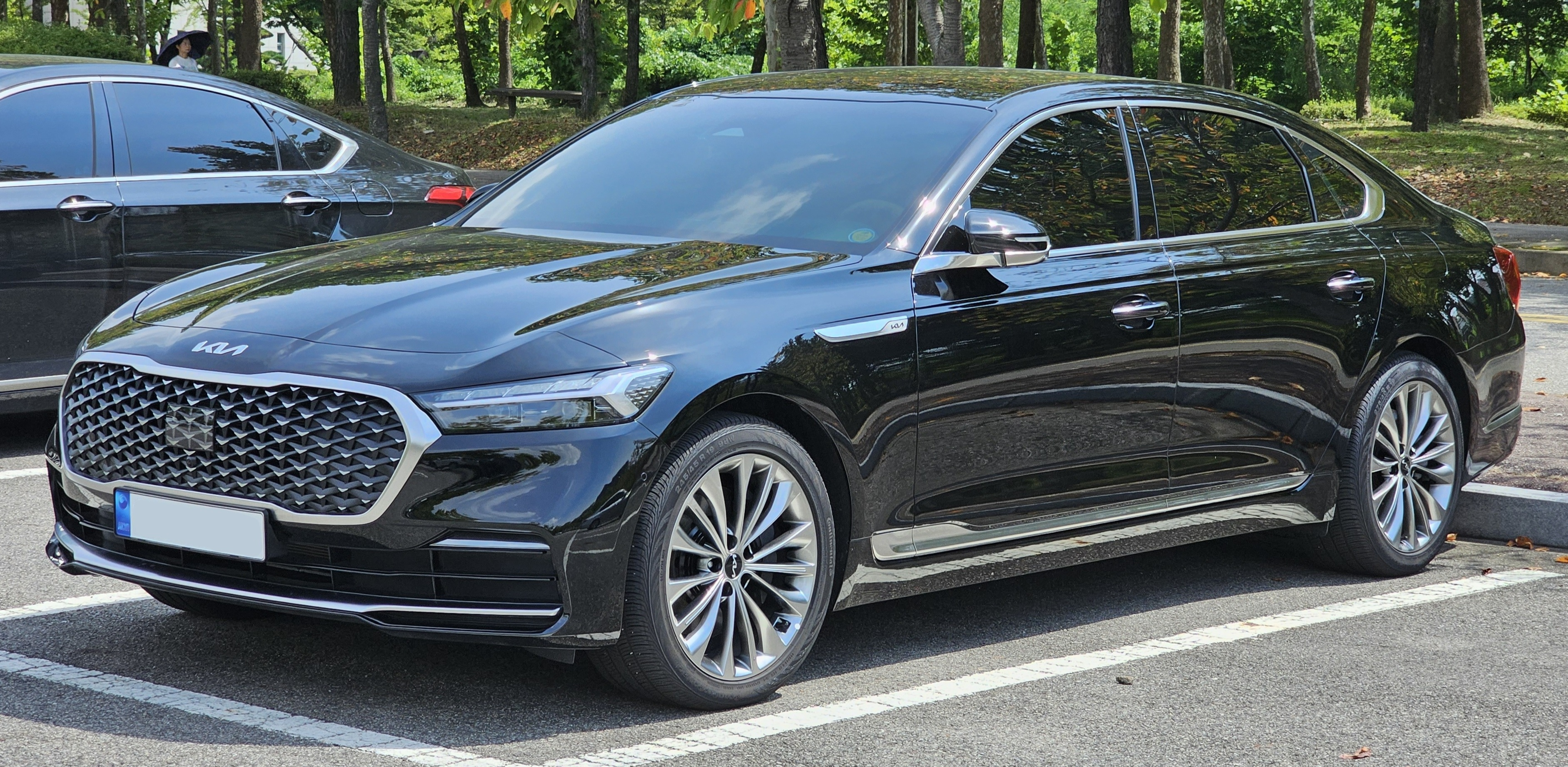

Overview
- Manufacturer: Kia Corporation
- Also called: Kia K900 (North America); Kia Quoris
- Production: 2012–2026

Body and chassis
- Class: Full-size luxury car (F)
- Body style: 4-door sedan
- Layout: Front-engine, rear-wheel-drive Front-engine, four-wheel-drive (2018–2026)

The Kia K9, also known as the Kia K900 in the United States and Canada and the Kia Quoris in other export markets, is a full-size luxury car manufactured and marketed by Kia, produced from 2012 to 2026.

It was first came out in its native country, South Korea, in May 2012, with export sales beginning in late of the same year. Then, since June 2013, it was sold in South Korea, United Arab Emirates, Colombia, Chile, Guatemala, Peru, Russia, the United States, and Canada. There are plans to release it in China, although Kia will not use the Quoris nameplate after it lost a legal battle.

The second-generation K9 was launched in 2018.

== First generation (KH; 2012) ==
First generation
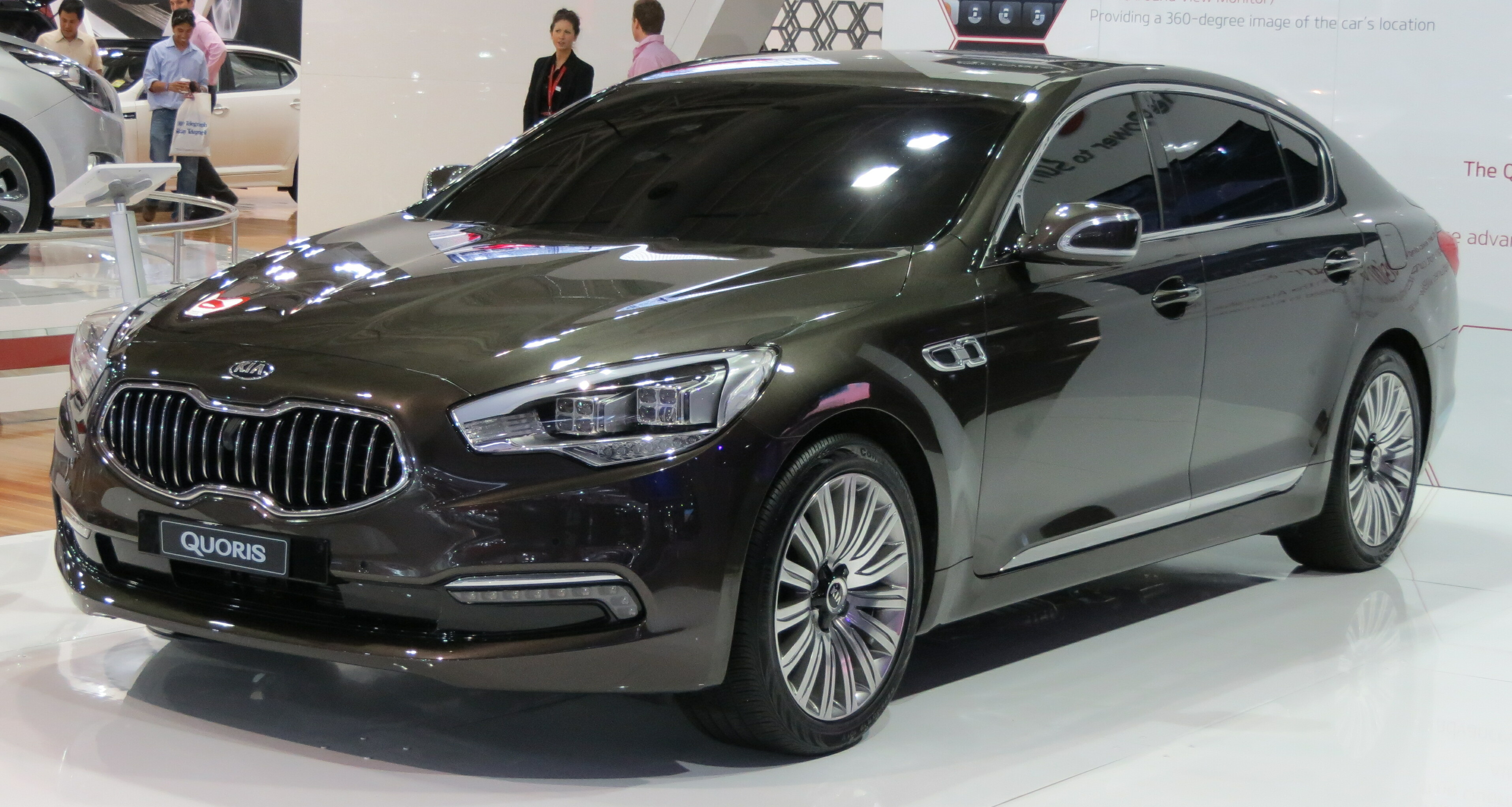
- Kia Quoris

Overview
- Model code: KH
- Also called: Kia K900 (United States and Canada); Kia Quoris (other export markets)
- Production: 2012–2018
- Model years: 2013–2018
- Assembly: Gwangmyeong, South Korea; Kaliningrad, Russia (Avtotor)
- Designer: Peter Schreyer (2009)

Body and chassis
- Layout: Front-engine, rear-wheel-drive
- Platform: Hyundai BH
- Related: Hyundai Equus; Hyundai Genesis

Powertrain
- Engine: 3.3 L Lambda II GDI V6; 3.8 L Lambda II MPI V6; 3.8 L Lambda II GDI V6; 5.0 L Tau GDI V8
- Transmission: 8-speed automatic

Dimensions
- Wheelbase: 3,045 mm (119.9 in)
- Length: 5,090 mm (200.4 in) (pre-facelift); 5,095 mm (200.6 in) (facelift)
- Width: 1,900 mm (74.8 in)
- Height: 1,485–1,490 mm (58.5–58.7 in)
- Curb weight: 1,870–1,985 kg (4,123–4,376 lb) (V6); 2,066–2,132 kg (4,555–4,700 lb) (V8)

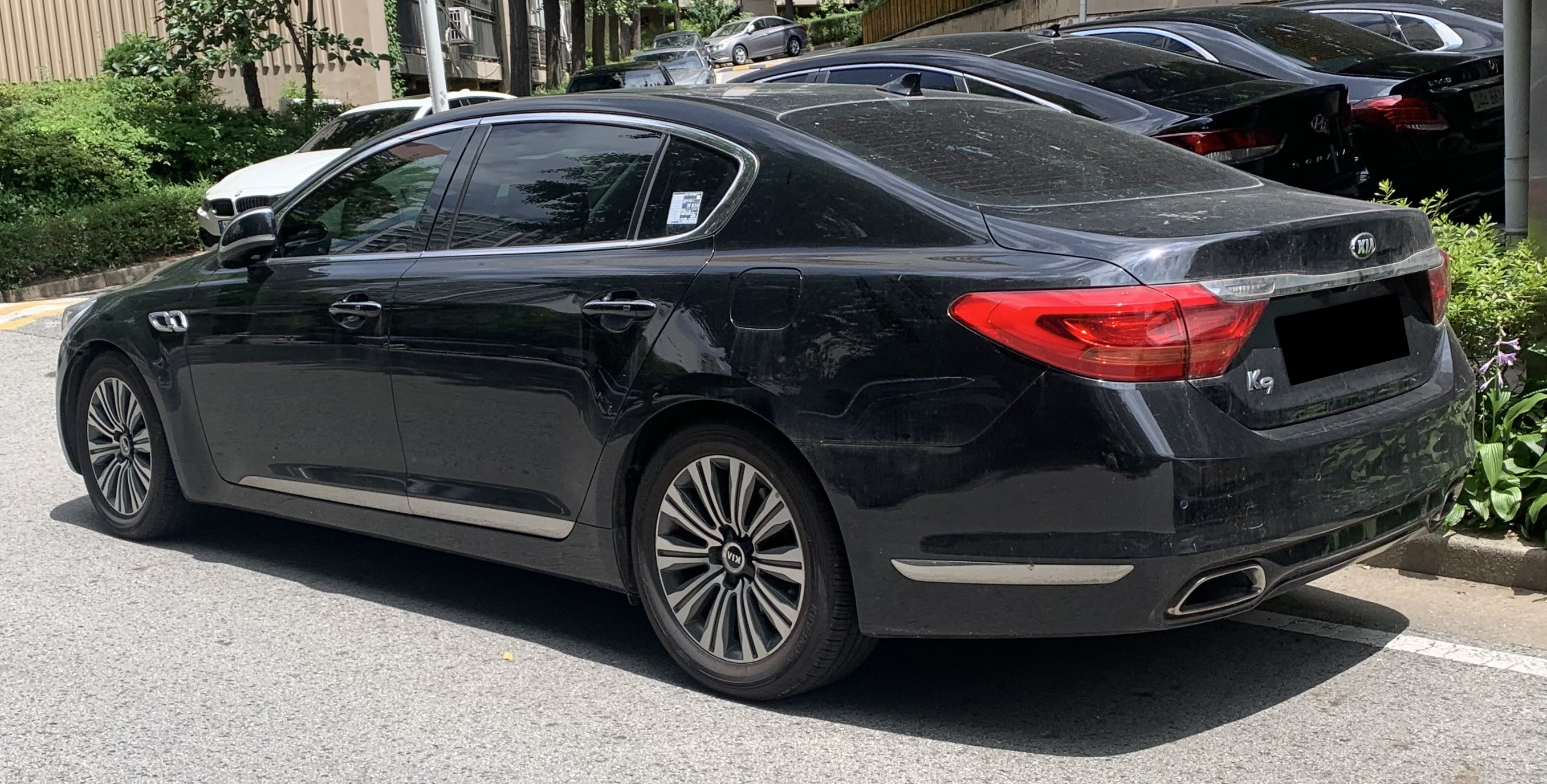
Rear view

The K9 is a derivative of the Hyundai Equus and Genesis, with which it shares the BH-L (VI) platform. It is the first rear-wheel-drive sedan Kia offered in the United States. The K9's development code was KH.

The K9 is slightly shorter than the Equus, and has a longer wheelbase than the Hyundai Genesis with shorter front overhang dimensions. The Quoris features Kia's "Tiger nose" grille as well as blind spot detection, head-up display and an adaptive front lighting system.

Launch engines in Korea include a 300 PS (221 kW; 296 bhp) 3.3 L (3,342 cc) V6 and a 334 PS (246 kW; 329 bhp) 3.8 L (3,778 cc) GDI (Gasoline Direction-Injection) V6, coupled with an eight-speed automatic transmission.

The Quoris debuted in Russia in 2013 with a 294 PS (216 kW; 290 bhp) 3.8L V6.

The K900 in the US uses a 426 PS (313 kW; 420 bhp) 5.0-litre (5,038 cc) GDI V8, producing 376 lb⋅ft (510 N⋅m) of torque. In Canada, the K900 can be fitted with either a 315 PS (232 kW; 311 bhp) 3.8L GDI V6, producing 293 lb⋅ft (397 N⋅m) of torque or the same 5.0L GDI V8 as the US market.

=== Powertrain ===
Specs
Model	Years	Transmission	Power	Torque	0–100 km/h (0-62 mph) (Official)	Top speed
3.3 Lambda II GDi	2012–2018	8-speed automatic	300 PS (221 kW; 296 hp) @ 6,400 rpm	35.5 kg⋅m (348 N⋅m; 257 lbf⋅ft) @ 5,200 rpm		240 km/h (149 mph)
3.8 Lambda II MPi	2013–2018	8-speed automatic	290 PS (213 kW; 286 hp) @ 6,200 rpm	36.5 kg⋅m (358 N⋅m; 264 lbf⋅ft) @ 5,000 rpm	7.3s	240 km/h (149 mph)
3.8 Lambda II GDi	2012–2018	8-speed automatic	334 PS (246 kW; 329 hp) @ 6,400 rpm	40.3 kg⋅m (395 N⋅m; 291 lbf⋅ft) @ 5,100 rpm	6.8s	240 km/h (149 mph)
3.8 Lambda II GDi	2015–2018	8-speed automatic	315 PS (232 kW; 311 hp) @ 6,000 rpm	40.5 kg⋅m (397 N⋅m; 293 lbf⋅ft) @ 5,000 rpm		240 km/h (149 mph)
5.0 Tau GDi	2014–2018	8-speed automatic	425 PS (313 kW; 419 hp) @ 6,400 rpm 430 PS (316 kW; 424 hp) @ 6,400 rpm	52 kg⋅m (510 N⋅m; 376 lbf⋅ft) @ 5,000 rpm	5.7s	240 km/h (149 mph)

== Second generation (RJ; 2018) ==
Second generation
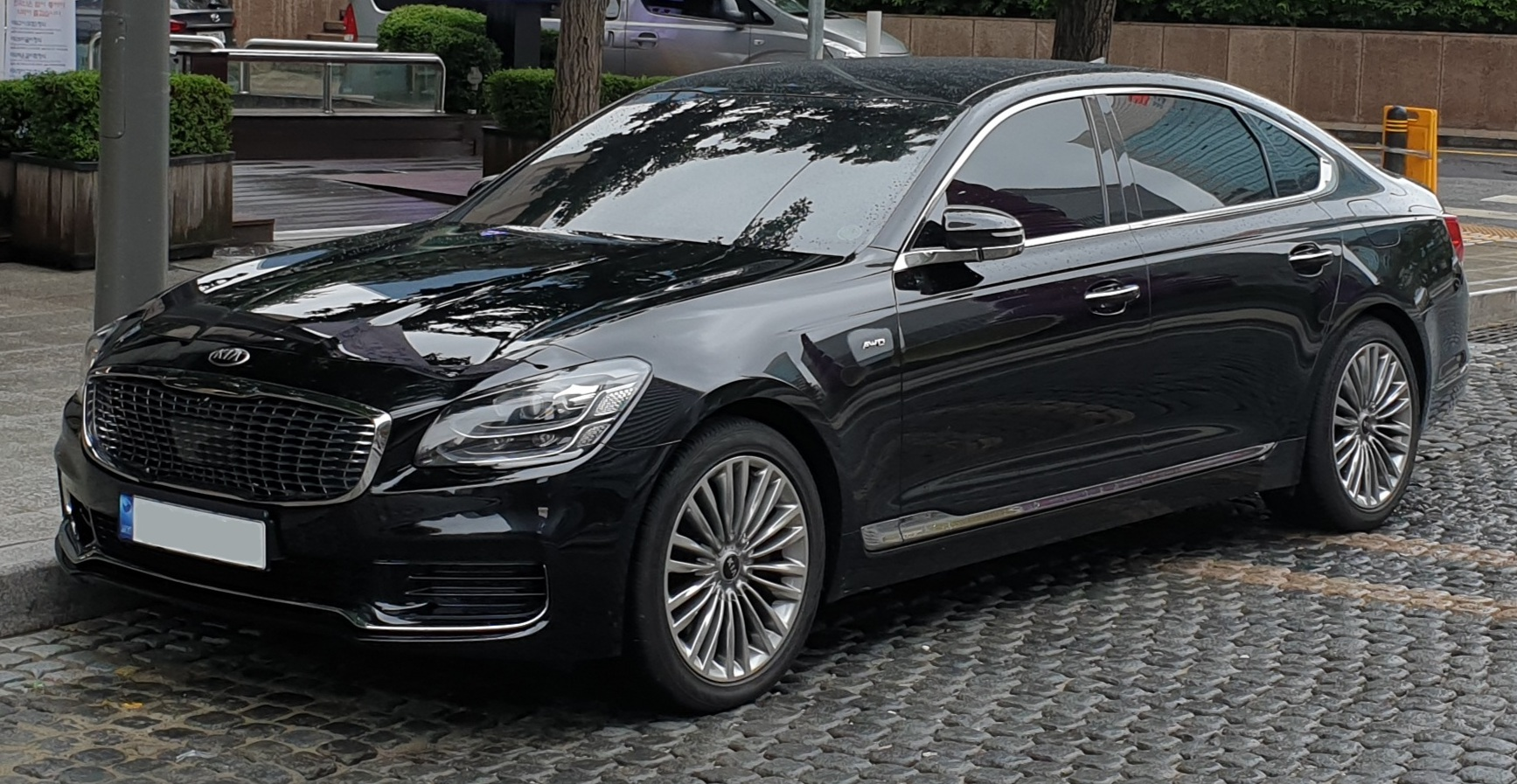

Overview
- Model code: RJ
- Also called: Kia K900 (United States, most markets)
- Production: 2018–2026
- Model years: 2019–2026
- Assembly: Gwangmyeong, South Korea
- Designer: Peter Schreyer; Karim Habib (2021 facelift)

Body and chassis
- Layout: Front-engine, rear-wheel-drive Front-engine, four-wheel-drive
- Platform: Hyundai M2 Platform
- Related: Genesis G90/EQ900; Genesis G80

Powertrain
- Engine: 3.3 L Lambda II GDI V6; 3.3 L Lambda II T-GDI V6; 3.8 L Lambda II GDI V6; 5.0 L Tau GDI V8
- Transmission: 8-speed automatic

Dimensions
- Wheelbase: 3,105 mm (122.2 in)
- Length: 5,120 mm (201.6 in) (pre-facelift); 5,140 mm (202.4 in) (facelift)
- Width: 1,915 mm (75.4 in)
- Height: 1,490–1,505 mm (58.7–59.3 in)
- Curb weight: 1,915–2,166 kg (4,222–4,775 lb)

Kia debuted the all new K9/K900 (still sold as the Quoris in a few markets) at the March 2018 New York International Auto Show. The new generation is longer and wider than the outgoing model, and has a wheelbase stretched by about 2.3 inches (60 mm). It retains the same 8-speed transmission, as well as the same three engine choices. The interior features higher quality leather and wood trim, as well as an analog clock developed by Maurice Lacroix. Kia also introduced an AWD model in South Korea for the second generation.

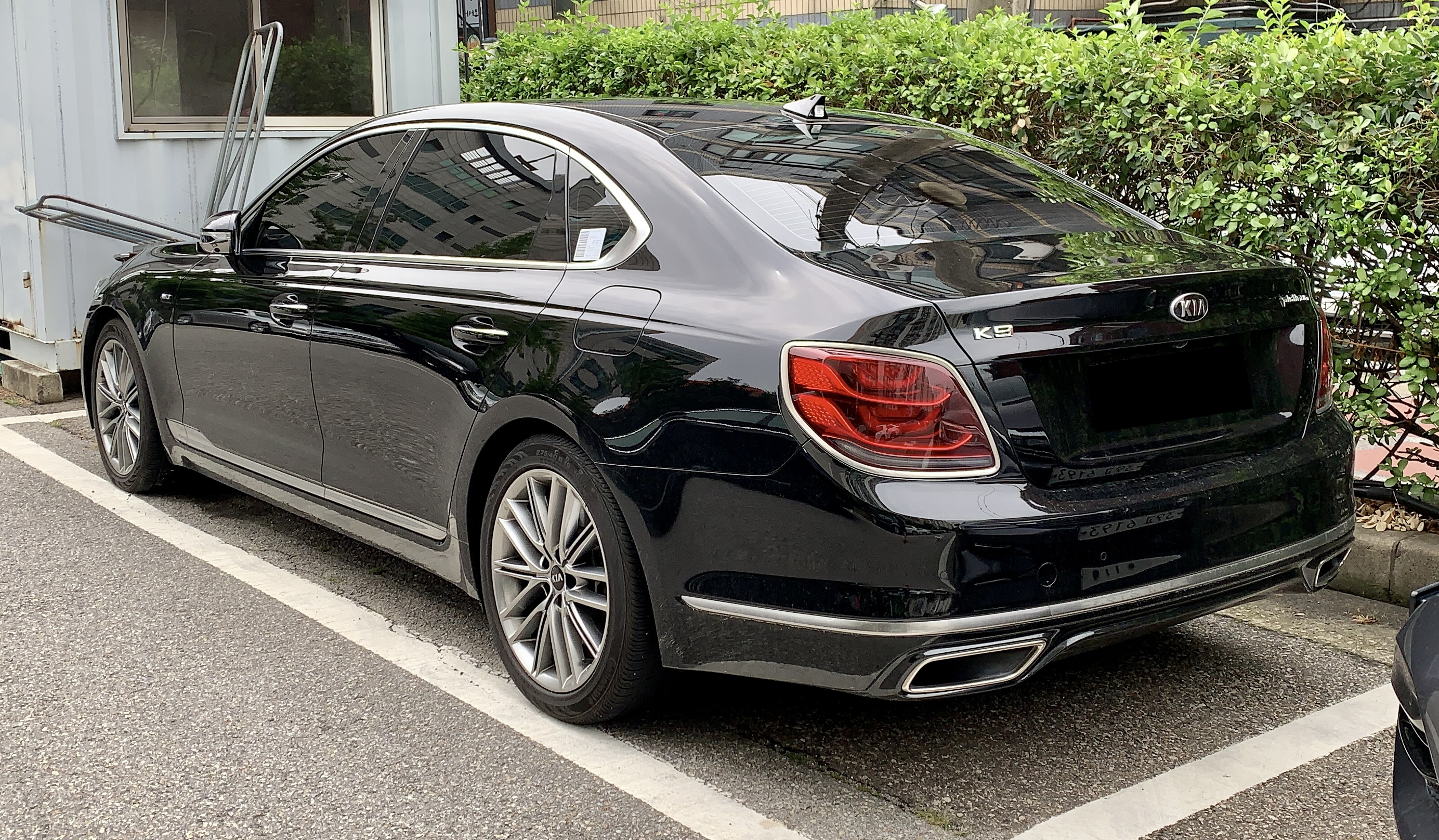
Rear view

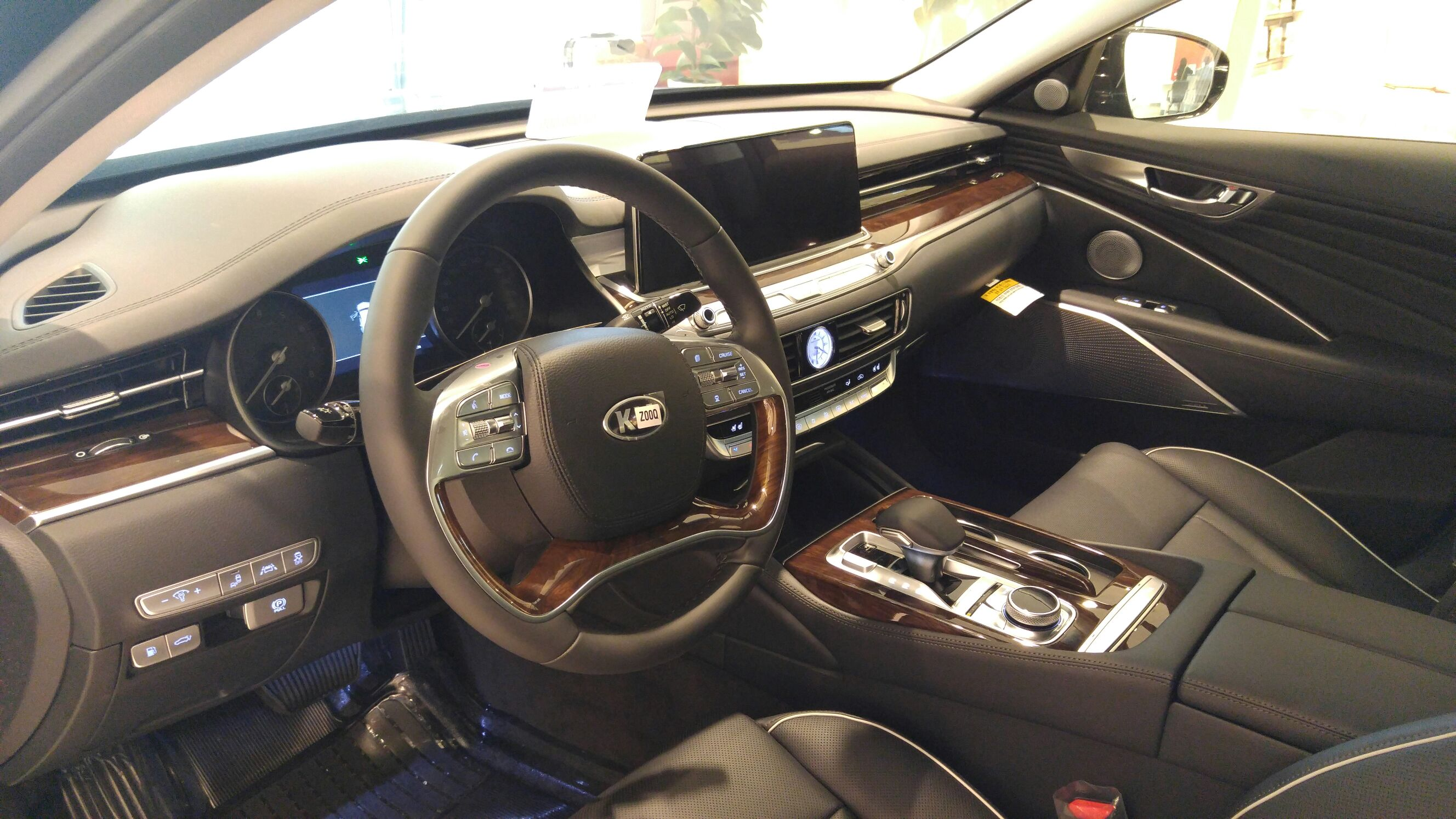
Interior

=== 2021 facelift ===
The exterior images of the newer facelift version were released on 17 May 2021. Compared to the pre-facelift model, it got a wider grille with chrome V logos, a full-width rear lamp, and a repositioned number plate. This version also got a tweaked interior, such as a larger 14.5-inch infotainment display and fingerprint authentication system.

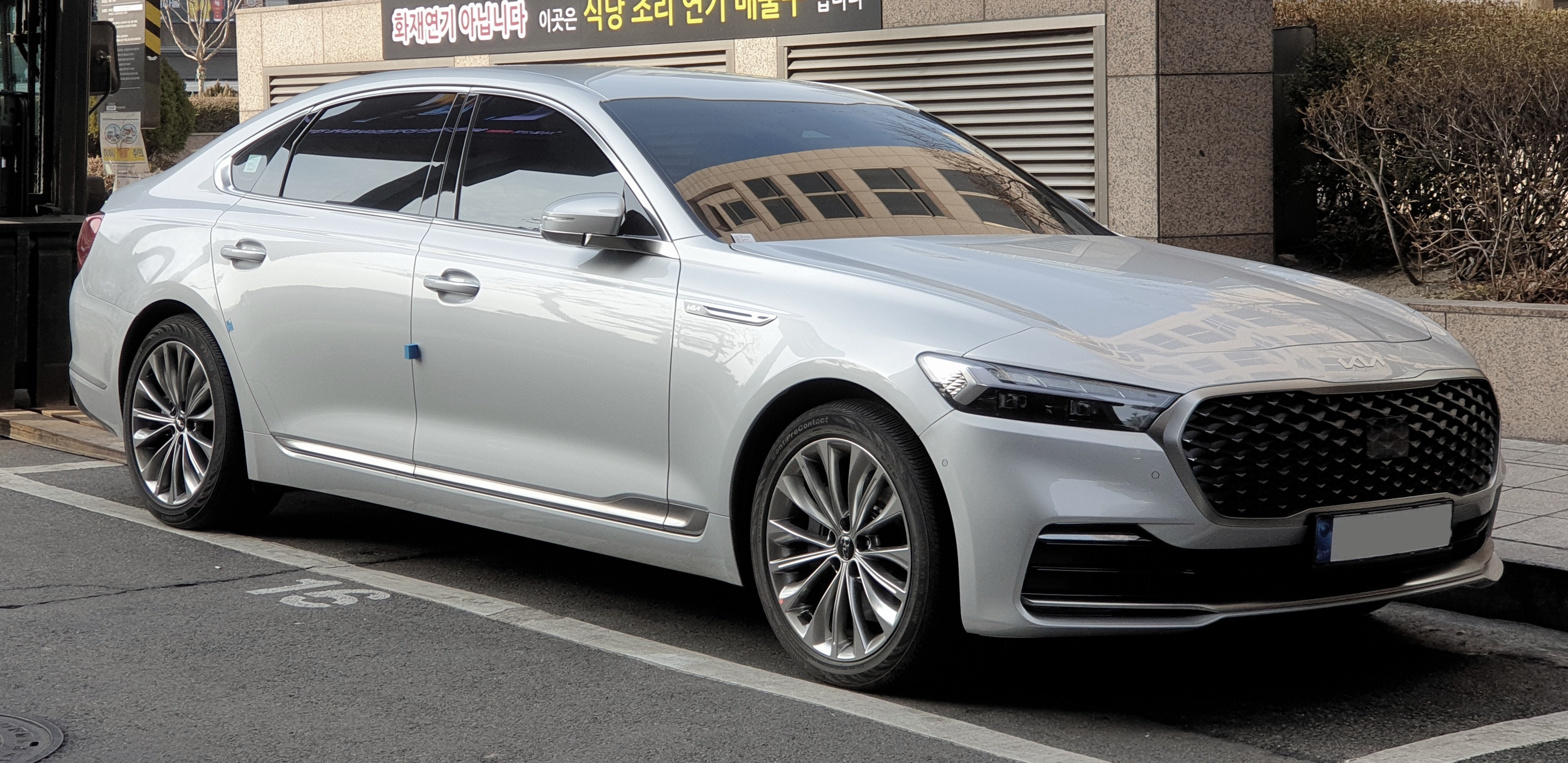
Kia K9 (facelift)

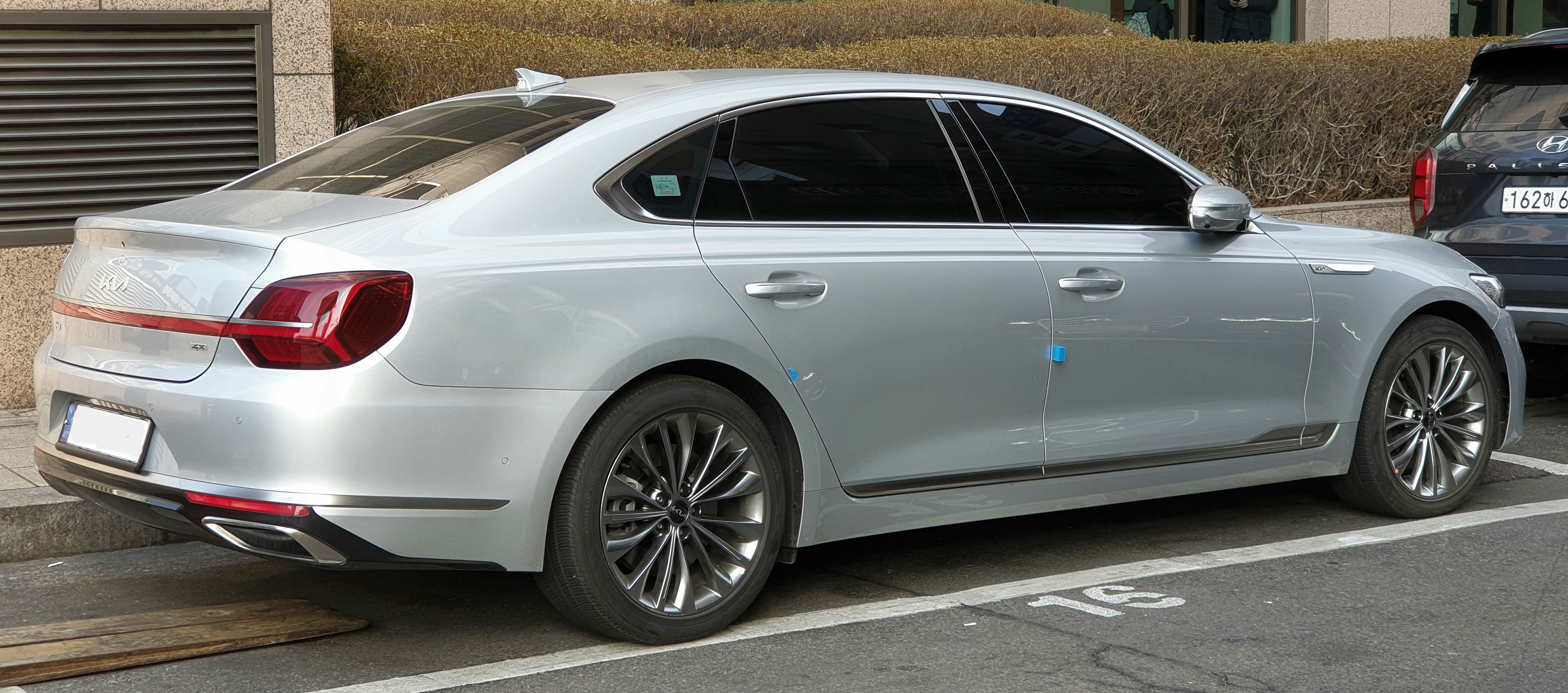
Kia K9 (facelift)

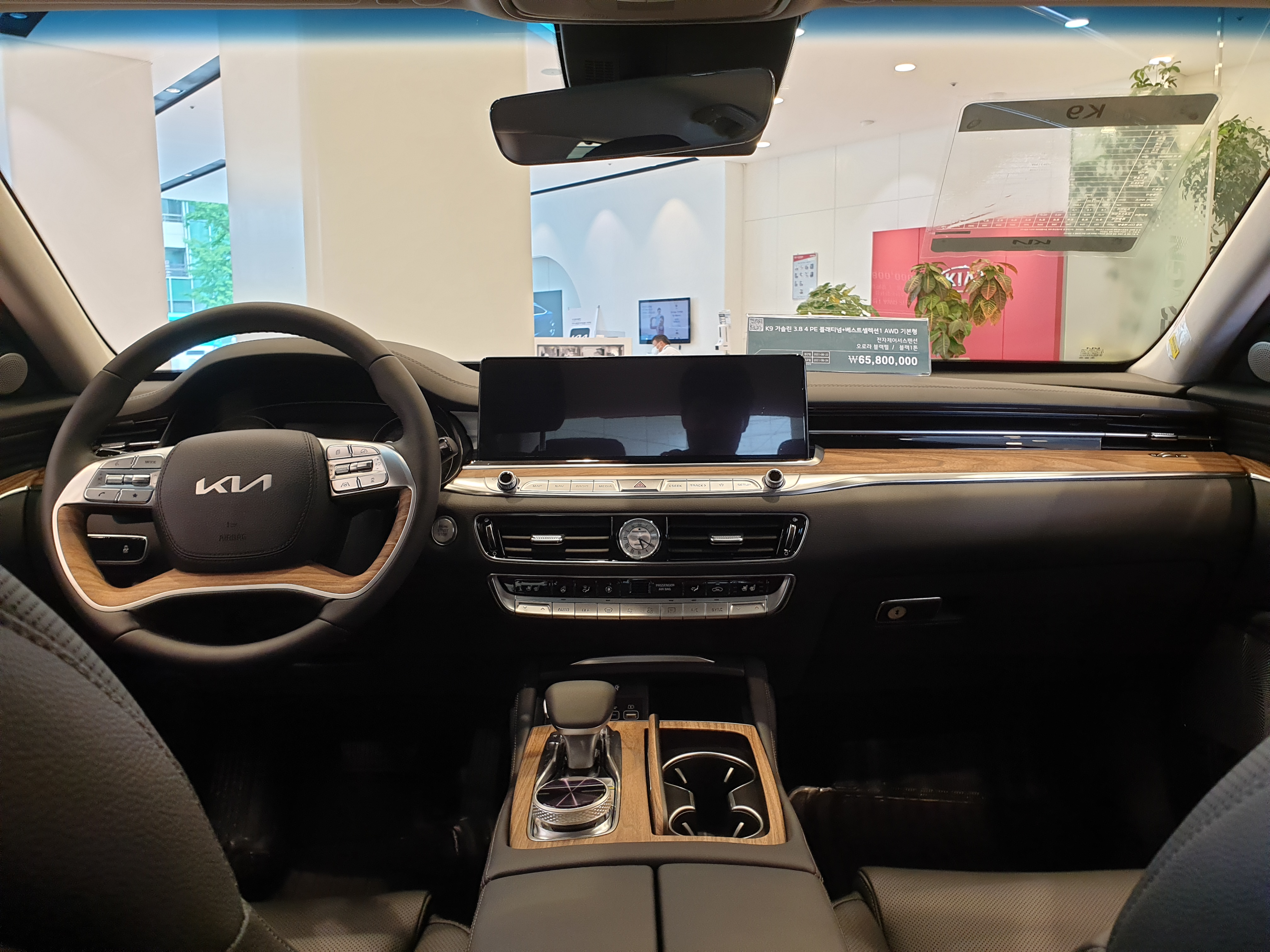
Interior (facelift)

=== Powertrain ===
Petrol engines
Model	Years	Transmission	Power	Torque	0–100 km/h (0-62 mph) (Official)	Top speed
3.3L Lambda II GDi	2018–present	8-speed automatic	249 PS (183 kW; 246 hp) @ 6,000 rpm 253 PS (186 kW; 250 hp) @ 6,000 rpm	35.4 kg⋅m (347 N⋅m; 256 lbf⋅ft) @ 5,000 rpm	8.0s (RWD); 8.4s (AWD)	240 km/h (149 mph)
3.3L Lambda II T-GDi	2018–present	8-speed automatic	370 PS (272 kW; 365 hp) @ 6,000 rpm	52 kg⋅m (510 N⋅m; 376 lbf⋅ft) @ 1,300–4,500 rpm		240 km/h (149 mph)
3.8L Lambda II GDi	2018–present	8-speed automatic	315 PS (232 kW; 311 hp) @ 6,000 rpm	40.5 kg⋅m (397 N⋅m; 293 lbf⋅ft) @ 5,000 rpm		240 km/h (149 mph)
5.0L Tau GDi	2018–2021	8-speed automatic	425 PS (313 kW; 419 hp) @ 6,000 rpm	53.0 kg⋅m (520 N⋅m; 383 lbf⋅ft) @ 5,000 rpm	5.7s (AWD)	240 km/h (149 mph)

== Marketing ==
To promote the K900, Kia Motors released their Super Bowl XLVIII commercial, featuring Laurence Fishburne reprising his role as Morpheus from The Matrix series. In October 2014, basketball player LeBron James was named Kia's K900 luxury ambassador.

The Kia K900 sold over 200 units per month from April to June in the U.S. market its launch year. Sales dropped to roughly 100-130 units in July and August 2014, and then to 56 in September and up to 62 October.

The K900 was discontinued in 2018 in Canada, and in 2021 in the United States. Kia cited the market transition from large cars to crossovers and SUVs. Only 305 units of the K900 were sold in the US in 2020.

== Discontinuation ==
On 6 July 2026, Kia has confirmed that the K9 will be discontinued at the end of 2026 after 14 years of production, due to declining sales. The K8 will soon serve as Kia's largest car due to its similar segment.

== Sales ==
Calendar year	South Korea	United States	Canada
2014	4,429	1,330	23
2015	4,294	2,524	36
2016	2,555	834	26
2017	1,553	455	7
2018	11,843	354	4
2019	10,878	390	—N/a
2020	7,831	305	—N/a
2021	6,432	85	—N/a
2022	6,736	—N/a	—N/a
2023	3,898	—N/a	—N/a
2024	2,209	—N/a	—N/a

== See also ==
- Kia GT Concept
- Kia Stinger
- Kia Opirus
