= Hyundai Lambda engine =

V6 engine manufactured by Hyundai

λ engine^{Lambda engine}

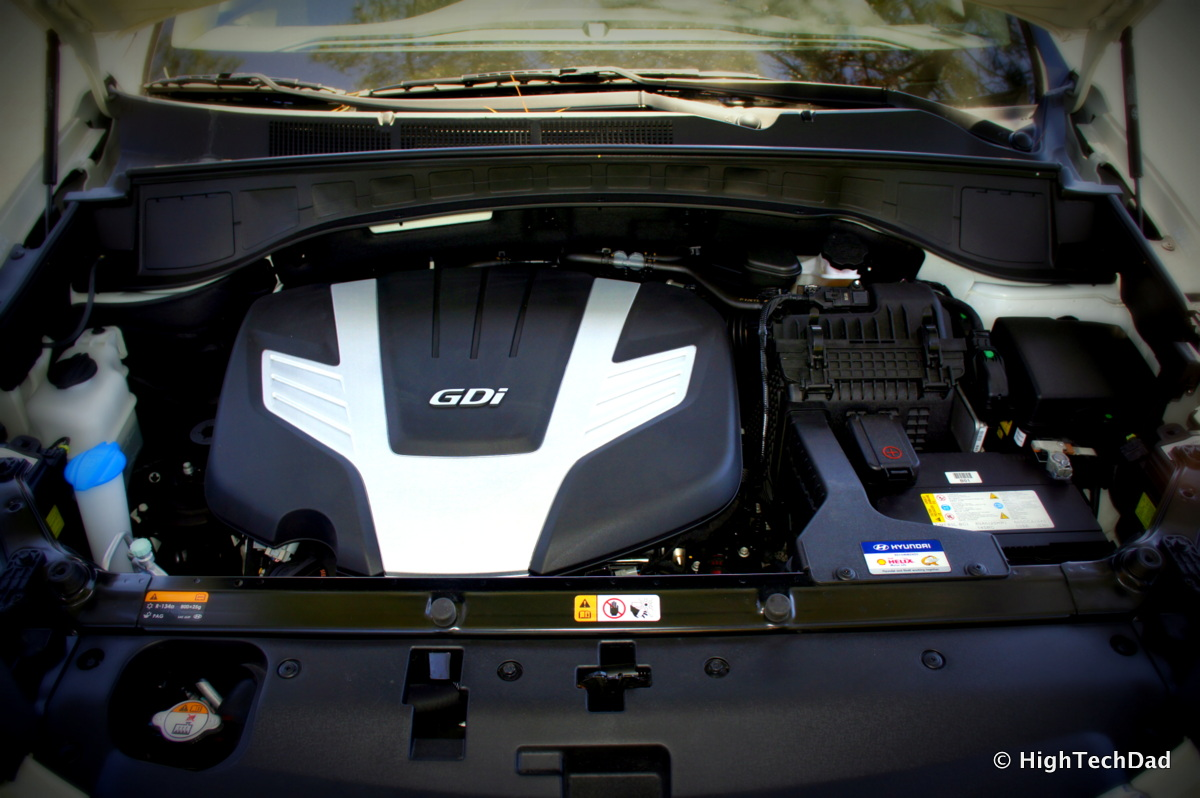

Overview
- Manufacturer: Hyundai Motor Company
- Production: 2005–present

Layout
- Configuration: 60° V6
- Displacement: 3.0 L (2,999 cc); 3.3 L (3,342 cc); 3.5 L (3,470 cc); 3.8 L (3,778 cc)
- Cylinder bore: 92 mm (3.62 in); 96 mm (3.78 in)
- Piston stroke: 75.2 mm (2.96 in); 83.8 mm (3.30 in); 87 mm (3.43 in)
- Cylinder block material: Aluminium
- Cylinder head material: Aluminium
- Valvetrain: DOHC 4 valves x cyl. with VVT
- Compression ratio: 10.4:1–13.0:1

Combustion
- Turbocharger: On Lambda II T-GDi
- Fuel system: Multi-point injection (MPi); Direct injection (GDi)
- Fuel type: Gasoline
- Cooling system: Water-cooled

Output
- Power output: 238–370 PS (175–272 kW; 235–365 hp)
- Torque output: 28.8–52 kg⋅m (282–510 N⋅m; 208–376 lb⋅ft)

Chronology
- Predecessor: Hyundai Sigma engine
- Successor: Hyundai Smartstream G3.5/G3.5T/L3.5

The Hyundai Lambda engine family is the company's all-aluminium V6 engine manufactured since 2005. It is currently manufactured at Hyundai's plant in Asan, South Korea. It used to be manufactured at HMMA plant in Montgomery, Alabama, United States. All versions of this engine use a timing chain.

== Lambda MPi ==
This engine family uses aluminium blocks and heads, variable valve timing on the intake side, and 4 valves per cylinder.

=== 3.3L (G6DB) ===
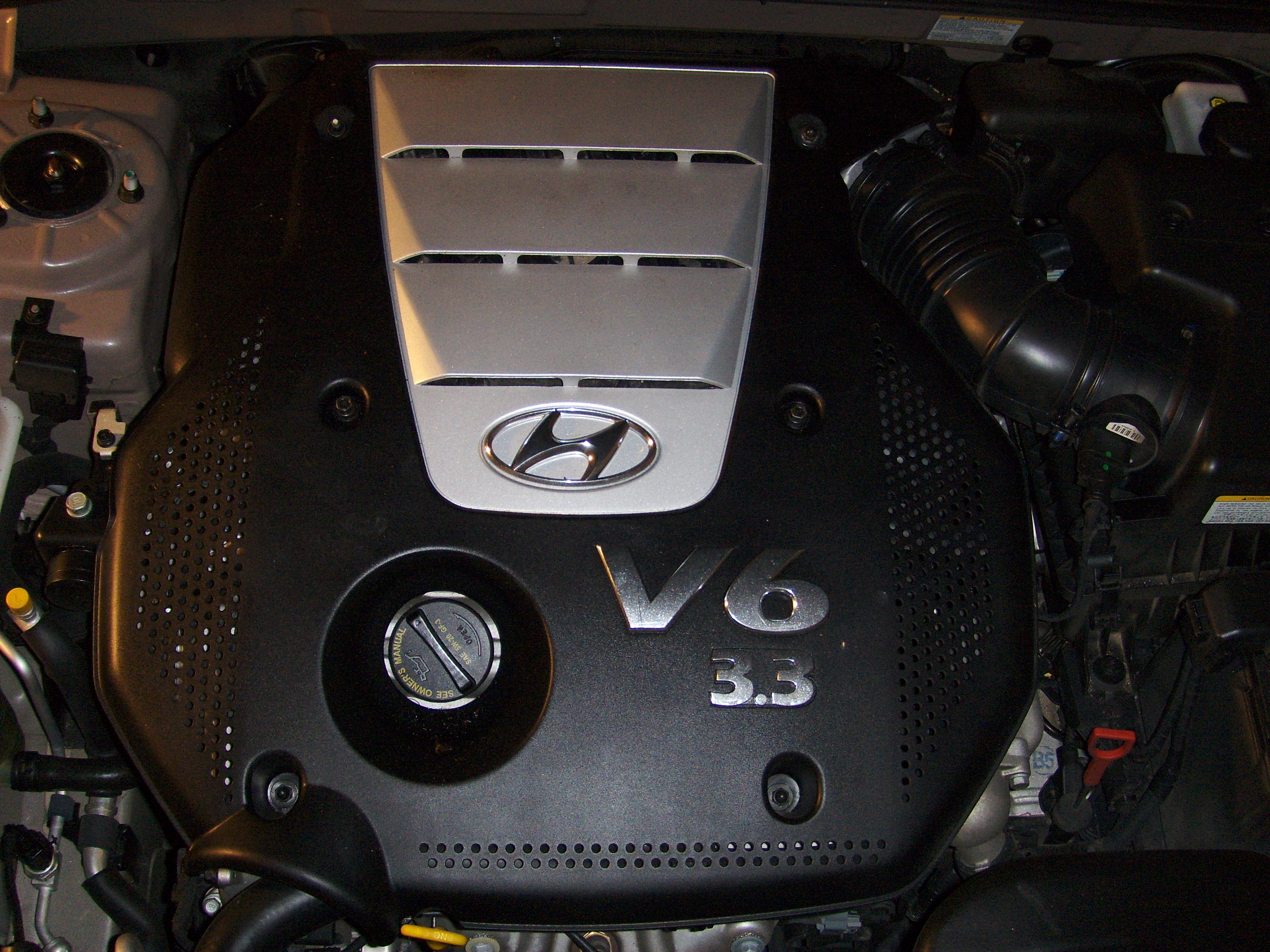
Hyundai 3.3L Lambda V6

The 3,342 cc (3.3 L) Lambda MPi G6DB version was introduced with the 2005 Sonata. Bore and stroke measure 92 mm × 83.8 mm (3.62 in × 3.30 in) and it makes 233–247 PS (171–182 kW; 230–244 hp) at 6,000 rpm and 31–31.5 kg⋅m (304–309 N⋅m; 224–228 lb⋅ft) of torque at 3,500 rpm.

Applications:

- 2006–2008 Hyundai Azera (TG)
- 2007–2009 Hyundai Santa Fe (CM)
- 2005–2009 Hyundai Sonata (NF)
- 2007–2009 Kia Opirus
- 2005–2009 Kia Sorento (BL)

=== 3.8L (G6DA) ===
The 3.8 L (3,778 cc) G6DA version has a 96 mm × 87 mm (3.78 in × 3.43 in) bore and stroke and produce 250–267 PS (184–196 kW; 247–263 hp) at 6,000 rpm and 35–35.5 kg⋅m (343–348 N⋅m; 253–257 lb⋅ft) of torque at 4,500 rpm.

Applications:

- 2005–2008 Hyundai Azera (TG)
- 2007–2009 Hyundai Entourage
- 2007–2008 Hyundai Centennial/Equus (YJ)
- 2007–2013 Hyundai Veracruz
- 2005–2010 Kia Amanti/Opirus
- 2005–2010 Kia Carnival/Sedona (VQ)
- 2007–2009 Kia Sorento (BL)

== Lambda II MPi ==
Changes to Lambda MPi series include adding a CVVT on the exhaust side as well, therefore it does have Dual CVVT.

=== 3.0L (G6DE) ===
The 3.0 Lambda II MPi engine is rated 250 PS (184 kW; 247 hp) at 6,400 rpm and 28.8 kg⋅m (282 N⋅m; 208 lb⋅ft) of torque at 5,000 rpm. Bore and stroke measure 92 mm × 75.2 mm (3.62 in × 2.96 in) for a total displacement of 3.0 L (2,999 cc).

Applications:

- 2011–2016 Hyundai Azera (HG)
- 2016–2019 Hyundai Azera (IG)

=== 3.3L (G6DB) ===
The 3,342 cc (3.3 L) Lambda II MPi version bore and stroke measure 92 mm × 83.8 mm (3.62 in × 3.30 in) and produce 259–274 PS (190–202 kW; 255–270 hp) at 6,200–6,400 rpm and 32.2–32.5 kg⋅m (316–319 N⋅m; 233–235 lb⋅ft) of torque at 4,500–5,300 rpm depending on the application.

Applications:

- 2009–2011 Hyundai Azera (TG)
- 2008–2009 Hyundai Sonata (NF)
- 2010–2012 Kia Opirus

=== 3.3L (G6DF) ===
The 3.3 Lambda II MPi version produces 270 PS (199 kW; 266 hp) at 6,400 rpm and 32.4 kg⋅m (318 N⋅m; 234 lb⋅ft) of torque at 5,300 rpm.

Applications:

- 2012–2018 Hyundai Santa Fe (DM)
- 2013–2018 Hyundai Grand Santa Fe (NC)
- 2016–2019 Kia Cadenza (YG)
- 2014–2020 Kia Carnival/Sedona (YP)
- 2014–2020 Kia Sorento (UM)

=== 3.5L (G6DC) ===
The 3.5 L (3,470 cc) Lambda II MPi G6DC Lambda II version debuted in the global version of the 2011 Kia Sorento. This engine comes with and is rated at 280–290 PS (206–213 kW; 276–286 hp) at 6,300-6,600 rpm and 34.3 kg⋅m (336 N⋅m; 248 lb⋅ft) at 5,000 rpm depending on application. Bore x stroke measure 92 mm × 87 mm (3.62 in × 3.43 in); it uses similar technology as the 3.3L and 3.8L variants of the Lambda family.

Applications:

- 2017–2022 Hyundai Azera (IG)
- 2018–present Hyundai Palisade (LX2)
- 2010–2012 Hyundai Santa Fe (CM)
- 2018–2020 Hyundai Santa Fe (TM)
- 2011–2016 Kia Cadenza (VG)
- 2020–2021 Kia Cadenza (YG)
- 2011–2014 Kia Carnival/Sedona (VQ)
- 2011–2014 Kia Sorento (XM)
- 2014–2020 Kia Sorento (UM)

=== 3.8L (G6DA) ===
The 3.8 L (3,778 cc) version has a 96 mm × 87 mm (3.78 in × 3.43 in) bore and stroke and produce 284–287 PS (209–211 kW; 280–283 hp) at 6,200 rpm and 36.4 kg⋅m (357 N⋅m; 263 lb⋅ft) of torque at 4,500 rpm.

Applications:

- 2011 Hyundai Azera (TG)
- 2008–2014 Kia Borrego/Mohave
- 2010–2012 Kia Opirus

== Lambda II GDi ==
This engine series includes Dual CVVT and GDI.

Hyundai debuted a GDI version of Lambda V6 at 2010 Beijing Auto Show. Hyundai presented few details but the engine has power rating of 302 PS (222 kW; 298 hp).

=== 3.0L (G6DG) ===
The 3.0 L (2,999 cc) Lambda II GDi G6DG version released with the Azera/Grandeur 5th generation. Compression ratio is 11.0:1 with a bore and stroke of 92 mm × 75.2 mm (3.62 in × 2.96 in). and produces 266–270 PS (196–199 kW; 262–266 hp) at 6,400 rpm and 31.4–32.3 kg⋅m (308–317 N⋅m; 227–234 lb⋅ft) of torque at 5,300 rpm.

Applications:

- 2012–2016 Hyundai Grandeur/Azera (HG)
- 2011–2016 Kia K7 (VG)

=== 3.0L (G6DL) ===
The 3.0L G6DL is the newer variant of the 3.0L GDI engine. The engine produces 266–270 PS (196–199 kW; 262–266 hp) at 6,400 rpm and 31.4–32.3 kg⋅m (308–317 N⋅m; 227–234 lb⋅ft) of torque at 5,300 rpm.

Applications:

- 2016–2019 Hyundai Grandeur/Azera (IG)
- 2018–2021 Kia K7 (YG)

=== 3.3L (G6DH) ===
The 3.3L G6DH version was introduced with the fifth generation Grandeur/Azera. Compression ratio is 11.5:1 and the engine produces 284–298 PS (209–219 kW; 280–294 hp) at 6,400 rpm and 34.3–35.3 kg⋅m (336–346 N⋅m; 248–255 lb⋅ft) of torque at 5,200 rpm.

Applications:

- 2011–2016 Hyundai Grandeur/Azera (HG)
- 2012–2018 Hyundai Santa Fe (DM)
- 2013–2018 Hyundai Maxcruz/Grand Santa Fe/Santa Fe XL (NC)
- 2011–2016 Kia Cadenza (VG)
- 2014–2018 Kia Carnival/Sedona (YP)
- 2014–2020 Kia Sorento (UM)

=== 3.3L (G6DM) ===
The 3.3L G6DM is the newer variant of the 3.3L GDI engine. Compression ratio is 12.0:1 and the engine produces 284–294 PS (209–216 kW; 280–290 hp) at 6,400 rpm and 35.0–35.3 kg⋅m (343–346 N⋅m; 253–255 lb⋅ft) of torque at 5,200 rpm.

Applications:

- 2016–2022 Hyundai Grandeur/Azera (IG)
- 2016–2021 Kia Cadenza (YG)
- 2018–2020 Kia Carnival/Sedona (YP)

=== 3.8L (G6DN) ===
The 3.8L Atkinson cycle version was introduced with the Hyundai Palisade and Kia Telluride. Compression ratio is 13.0:1 and the engine produces 295 PS (217 kW; 291 hp) at 6,000 rpm and 36.2 kg⋅m (355 N⋅m; 262 lb⋅ft) of torque at 5,200 rpm.

Applications:

- 2018–2024 Hyundai Palisade (LX2)
- 2019–2025 Kia Telluride

== Lambda II RS MPi ==
The Lambda II RS (Rear-drive Sport) designation denotes longitudinal Lambda engine variants.

=== 3.3L (G6DB) ===
The engine produces 262 PS (193 kW; 258 hp) at 6,200 rpm and 32.2 kg⋅m (316 N⋅m; 233 lb⋅ft) of torque at 4,500 rpm.

Applications:

- 2008–2011 Hyundai Genesis (BH)

=== 3.8L (G6DA/G6DK) ===
The 3.8L version for the Genesis Coupe produces 303–316 PS (223–232 kW; 299–312 hp) at 6,400 rpm and 36.6 kg⋅m (359 N⋅m; 265 lb⋅ft) of torque at 4,600 rpm, while in the Genesis (Sedan) it produces 290 PS (213 kW; 286 hp) at 6,200 rpm and 36.5 kg⋅m (358 N⋅m; 264 lb⋅ft) of torque at 4,500 rpm.

The engine is all-aluminium, featuring DOHC, Dual CVVT and 24 valves.

Applications:

- 2009–2011 Hyundai Equus (VI)
- 2008–2011 Hyundai Genesis (BH)
- 2009–2015 Hyundai Genesis Coupe
- 2013–2018 Kia K9 (KH)
- 2013–2017 Oulim Spirra CregiT

== Lambda II RS GDi ==
Hyundai released a GDI variant of the Lambda RS engine for the 2012 Genesis and 2013 Genesis Coupe.

=== 3.0L (G6DG) ===
This engine produces 257 PS (189 kW; 253 hp) at 6,000 rpm and 31 kg⋅m (304 N⋅m; 224 lb⋅ft) of torque at 5,000 rpm.

Applications:

- 2013–2016 Hyundai Genesis

=== 3.3L (G6DH) ===
The engine produces 282 PS (207 kW; 278 hp) at 6,000 rpm and 35.4 kg⋅m (347 N⋅m; 256 lb⋅ft) of torque at 5,000 rpm, earlier version of this engine were making 300 PS (221 kW; 296 hp) at 6,400 rpm and 35.5 kg⋅m (348 N⋅m; 257 lb⋅ft) of torque at 5,200 rpm.

Applications:

- 2016–2020 Genesis G80 (DH)
- 2011–2016 Hyundai Genesis
- 2012–2018 Kia K9 (KH)

=== 3.3L (G6DM) ===
The engine produces 253 PS (186 kW; 250 hp) at 6,000 rpm and 35.4 kg⋅m (347 N⋅m; 256 lb⋅ft) of torque at 5,000 rpm.

Applications:

- 2018–2021 Kia K9 (RJ)

=== 3.8L (G6DJ/G6DN) ===
The 3.8 L (3,778 cc) version compression ratio is 11.5:1 and power output varies depending on configuration.
It produces:

- 334–338 PS (246–249 kW; 329–333 hp) at 6,400 rpm and 40.3 kg⋅m (395 N⋅m; 291 lb⋅ft) of torque at 5,100 rpm for the 2011–2014 Genesis Sedan and Hyundai Equus.
- 350–353 PS (257–260 kW; 345–348 hp) at 6,400 rpm and 40.8 kg⋅m (400 N⋅m; 295 lb⋅ft) of torque at 5,300 rpm for the Genesis Coupe
- 315 PS (232 kW; 311 hp) at 6,000 rpm and 40.5 kg⋅m (397 N⋅m; 293 lb⋅ft) of torque at 5,000 rpm for the 2013–2020 Genesis Sedan/Genesis G80 and Genesis G90.

Applications:

- 2016–2020 Genesis G80 (DH)
- 2015–2021 Genesis G90 (HI)
- 2011–2015 Hyundai Equus (VI)
- 2011–2016 Hyundai Genesis
- 2011–2016 Hyundai Genesis Coupe
- 2012–Present Kia K9

== Lambda II RS T-GDi ==
=== 3.3L (G6DP) ===
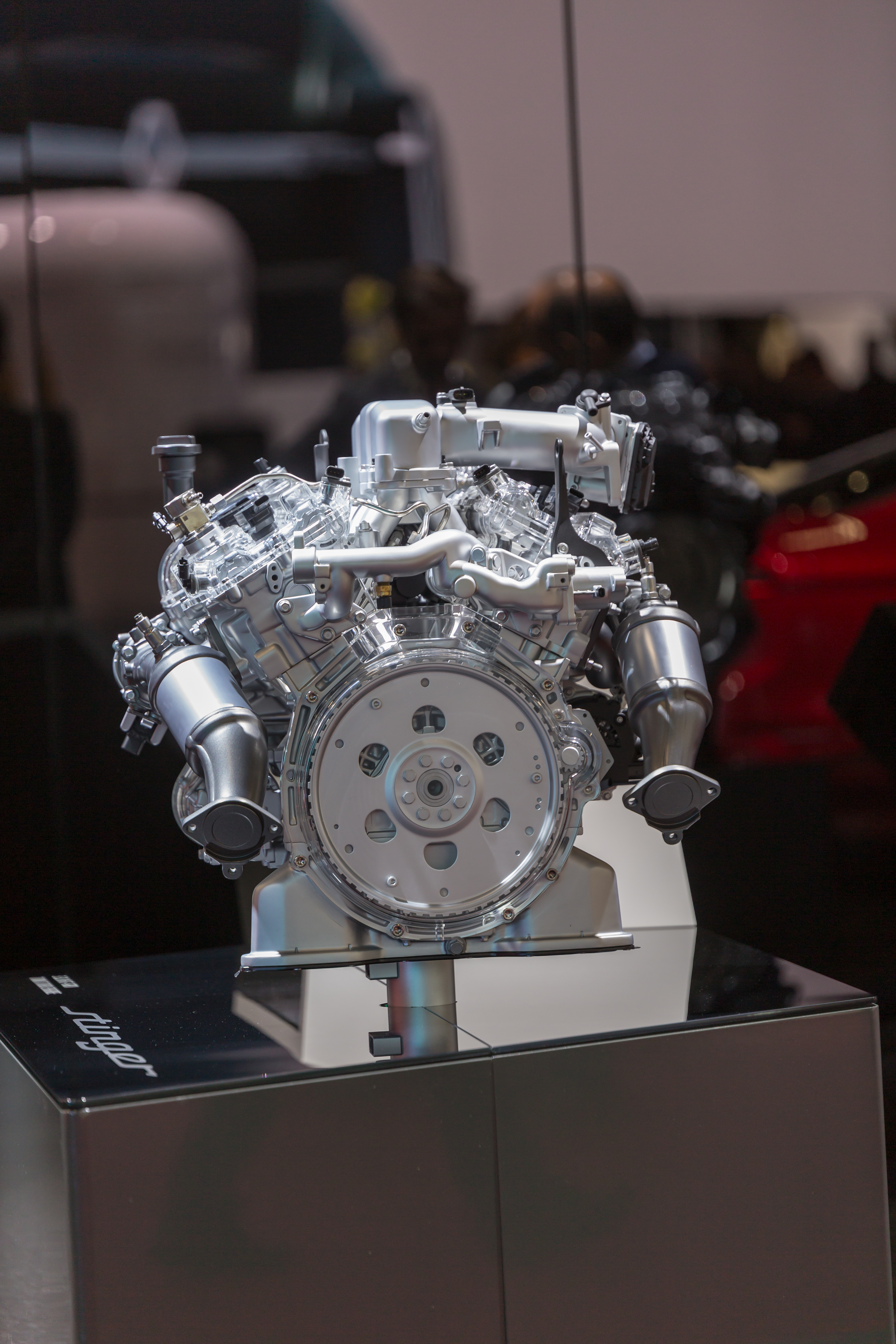
Lambda II engine at Paris Motor Show 2018

It is a twin-turbocharged version of the Lambda II GDi 3.3 engine.

It produces 370 PS (272 kW; 365 hp) at 6,000 rpm and 52 kg⋅m (510 N⋅m; 376 lb⋅ft) of torque between 1,300 and 4,500 rpm.

Applications:

- 2017–2026 Genesis G70
- 2016–2020 Genesis G80 (DH)
- 2015–2021 Genesis G90 (HI)
- 2018–present Kia K9 (RJ)
- 2017–2023 Kia Stinger

== Lambda II LPi ==
Modified Lambda engine that includes support for LPI injection instead.

=== 3.0L (L6DB) ===
It produces 235 PS (173 kW; 232 hp) at 6,000 rpm and 28.6 kg⋅m (280 N⋅m; 207 lb⋅ft) of torque at 4,500 rpm. Bore and stroke measure 92 mm × 75.2 mm (3.62 in × 2.96 in) for a total displacement of 2,999 cc (3.0 L).

Applications:

- 2011–2022 Hyundai Grandeur
- 2011–2021 Kia K7

== Modified race engines ==
Rhys Millen Racing (RMR) has developed a 750 bhp (559 kW; 760 PS) version of the Lambda II RS MPi engine in an attempt to break the Pikes Peak International Hill Climb (PPIHC) record. The race-version is reported to have been bored and stroked to 4.1 liters of swept displacement with an added turbocharger to increase power output.

== Crate engines ==
On 5 November 2013, Hyundai announced the creation of a new factory crate engine program at the 2013 SEMA Show in Las Vegas, which initially included a Lambda 3.8-liter, direct-injected V6 engine. The crate engine program began in December 2013.

== See also ==
- List of Hyundai engines
