= Kia Opirus =

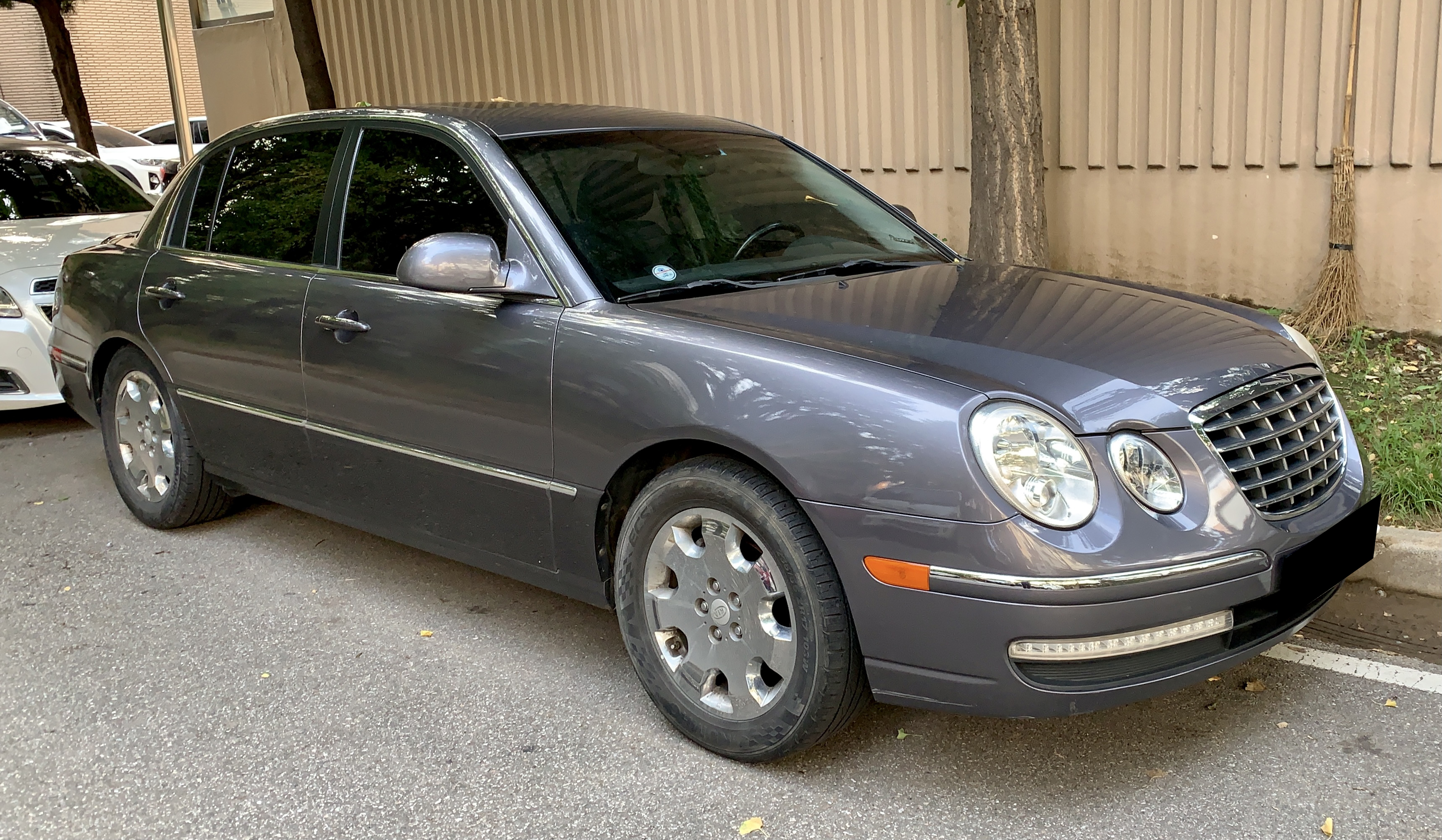

Overview
- Manufacturer: Kia Motors
- Also called: Kia Amanti (North America)
- Production: 2003–2011
- Model years: 2003–2012; 2004–2009 (North America)
- Assembly: South Korea: Hwasung (Hwasung Plant); Russia: Kaliningrad (Avtotor)

Body and chassis
- Class: Executive car/Full-size car (E)
- Body style: 4-door sedan
- Layout: Transverse front-engine, front-wheel drive
- Related: Hyundai Grandeur (XG); Hyundai Grandeur (TG)

Powertrain
- Engine: Petrol: 2.7 L Delta V6; 2.7 L Mu V6; 3.0 L Sigma V6; 3.3 L Lambda V6; 3.5 L Sigma V6; 3.8 L Lambda V6; Petrol LPG: 2.7 L Mu LPi V6
- Transmission: 5-speed automatic; 6-speed automatic

Dimensions
- Wheelbase: 2,800 mm (110.2 in)
- Length: 4,980 mm (196.1 in) (Pre-facelift); 5,000 mm (196.9 in) (Facelift)
- Width: 1,850 mm (72.8 in)
- Height: 1,485 mm (58.5 in)
- Curb weight: 1,665–1,864 kg (3,671–4,109 lb)

Chronology
- Predecessor: Kia Enterprise
- Successor: Kia K7/Cadenza

The Kia Opirus is an executive car/full-size sedan, manufactured by Kia Motors and marketed over a single generation for model years 2003–2012 globally and 2004–2009 in North America. Having debuted internationally at the 2003 Geneva Motor Show, the four-door, five-passenger, front-engine, front-drive sedan was launched to the North American market at the New York International Auto Show and in San Diego, bearing the Amanti nameplate — and prioritizing luxury content and comfort over dynamic performance and agility.

Intended to give Kia upward access to global premium markets, the Opirus represented a departure for the brand in both styling and market positioning. Developed over 22 months at a cost US$167 million (€143 million), 18% of the overall development cost went to R&D investment and 41% to development of production technologies.

As Kia's first premium vehicle, the Opirus replaced the Mazda 929-derived Enterprise in the South Korean domestic market. The Opirus was also the first Kia vehicle sharing a platform with sister company Hyundai, using a variation of the third generation Hyundai Grandeur/XG Y4 platform. For the Opirus, the platform was lengthened 1.9 inches, overall length increased 4.1 inches and height increased 2.6 inches. As Kia's largest sedan, the Opirus was marketed in a single trim level, sharing components with the Grandeur/XG, and a range of engines including its 3.5 L V6 engine (North America). All models were manufactured in Kia's Hwaseong Plant near Incheon.

A 2007 facelift, introduced at the 2006 Paris Auto Show, included upgraded specifications, a curb weight reduction of 250 pounds, revised suspension and a 3.8 L V6 engine (North America) with a 32-percent increase in power over its predecessor. Styling revisions included a shorter and wider grille, revised hood, headlamps, front and rear bumper fascias, alloy wheels, trunk deck lid, tail lamps, dual exhaust outlets and rear quarter panels. The interior featured a revised instrument panel design.

The name Opirus referred to the ancient city of Ophir, noted for its wealth — and was selected via an online survey from the choices of Opirus, Regent and Conzern. In 2004, the New York Times described the name Amanti as an untranslatable latinate construction, intended to connote luxury.

== Design and equipment ==
The Opirus' styling — described variously as conservative, neo-classic, restrained, unoriginal and derivative — drew cues from disparate sources, notably the Mercedes-Benz E-class, Lincoln Town Car, Jaguar S-Type, Lexus GS, Chrysler 300C, and Lancia Thesis.

In the Korean Domestic Market, interior features included available heated and reclining rear seats, high-intensity-discharge headlights, navigation system, electro-luminescent gauges, ignition immobilizer, reverse parking sensors and electronically adjustable suspension settings.

In North America, the sedan was marketed to value-sensitive 40-to-60-year-old professionals with standard equipment at introduction including manually tilting leather-wrapped, four-spoke steering wheel with faux woodgrain inserts and remote audio and cruise controls; faux wood grain dash, console and door accents (lighter prior to the 2007 facelift, darker thereafter); power locks and windows; CD player with six speakers; electronic driver- and passenger-adjustable climate control; front, curtain and side airbags; dual zone automatic climate control; keyless entry; herring bone cloth interior; glove-box only key; elongated LED turn-signals; rain-sensing windshield wipers; analog clock; foot-operated parking brake (releasable by a dash-mounted pull-handle); power moonroof; 16" alloy wheels; full-size spare on an alloy wheel; and an eight-way powered driver's bucket seat and four-way passenger bucket seat with door-mounted adjustment controls using a "mock-seat" ergonomic design. The interior received heavy acoustic insulation, and later models included heated rear seats, and electro-luminescent instrument lighting. European models include two ISOFIX anchorage points.

Options included leather interior, 270-watt Infinity stereo with subwoofer and six-disc changer, dashboard LCD screen, trip computer with 4" LCD screen, heated seats, Adjustable pedals, auto-dimming rearview mirror, and pearl coat paint. Safety equipment included eight airbags, and obstruction-sensing, anti-pinch power windows.

The Opirus offered a passenger volume of 105.6 cubic feet and a 15.5 cubic foot cargo volume — the trunk equipped with a gas strut-assisted lid and luggage restraining net.

In North America, J.D. Power and Associates recognized the Amanti as the "Most Appealing Premium Midsize Car" in its 2005 Automotive Performance, Execution and Layout Study.

== Drivetrain ==
The Opirus was marketed globally with the 3.5L Sigma and the 3.8L Lambda engines. The North American Amanti featured the 3.5 liter engine producing 200 bhp at 5500 rpm and 220 lb.-ft. of torque at 3500 rpm. Shifting was by a 5-speed automatic transmission, shifting either in fully automatic or manual sequential modes — the latter controlled via an H-shaped shift gate. Steering was an electronically power assisted rack and pinion system with an overall ratio of 15.24:1 and a turning radius of 5.7 meters.

Suspension featured coil springs, anti-roll bars (26 mm front, 16 mm rear), gas-pressurized shocks, a front independent, double A-arm (wishbone) design with unequal-length control arms and rear multi-link rear geometry. Suspension included an ECS (electronically controlled suspension) system with automatic and sport mode, selectable via a switch adjacent to the transmission shift gate and the sport mode providing stiffer shock absorber settings.

Brakes included 11.9/11.2-inch front/rear discs with four channel, four sensors ABS (anti-lock brakes), BAS (emergency brake assist), EBD (electronic brake force distribution), TCS (traction control system), and ESP (electronic stability program).

The Opirus is the first Kia to integrate an Electronic Stability Program (ESP), developed with Continental Teves of Germany.

== Engines ==
Specs
Model	Years	Transmission	Power@rpm	Torque@rpm	0–100 km/h (0–62 mph) (Official)	Top Speed
Petrol
Delta 2.7L	2003–2004	5-speed automatic	176 PS (129 kW; 174 hp) @ 6,000 rpm	24.2 kg⋅m (237 N⋅m; 175 lbf⋅ft) @ 4,000 rpm		206 km/h (128 mph)
Delta 2.7L	2005–2006	5-speed automatic	182 PS (134 kW; 180 hp) @ 6,000 rpm	24.7 kg⋅m (242 N⋅m; 179 lbf⋅ft) @ 4,000 rpm		206 km/h (128 mph)
Mu 2.7L	2007–2009	5-speed automatic	192 PS (141 kW; 189 hp) @ 6,000 rpm	25.5 kg⋅m (250 N⋅m; 184 lbf⋅ft) @ 4,200 rpm		
Mu 2.7L	2010–2012	6-speed automatic	195 PS (143 kW; 192 hp) @ 6,000 rpm	25.6 kg⋅m (251 N⋅m; 185 lbf⋅ft) @ 4,200 rpm		
Sigma 3.0L	2003–2006	5-speed automatic	187 PS (138 kW; 184 hp) @ 5,500 rpm	25.9 kg⋅m (254 N⋅m; 187 lbf⋅ft) @ 3,500 rpm		208 km/h (129 mph)
Lambda 3.3L	2007–2009	5-speed automatic	247 PS (182 kW; 244 hp) @ 6,000 rpm	31.5 kg⋅m (309 N⋅m; 228 lbf⋅ft) @ 3,500 rpm		
Lambda 3.3L	2010–2012	6-speed automatic	259 PS (190 kW; 255 hp) @ 6,200 rpm	32.2 kg⋅m (316 N⋅m; 233 lbf⋅ft) @ 4,800 rpm		
Sigma 3.5L	2003–2006	5-speed automatic	203 PS (149 kW; 200 hp) @ 5,500 rpm	30.4 kg⋅m (298 N⋅m; 220 lbf⋅ft) @ 3,500 rpm	9.2s	220 km/h (137 mph)
Lambda 3.8L	2005–2006	5-speed automatic	250 PS (184 kW; 247 hp) @ 6,000 rpm	35 kg⋅m (343 N⋅m; 253 lbf⋅ft) @ 3,500 rpm		220 km/h (137 mph)
Lambda 3.8L	2007–2010	5-speed automatic	267 PS (196 kW; 263 hp) @ 6,000 rpm	36 kg⋅m (353 N⋅m; 260 lbf⋅ft) @ 4,500 rpm	7.5s	230 km/h (143 mph)
Lambda 3.8L	2010–2012	6-speed automatic	284 PS (209 kW; 280 hp) @ 6,000 rpm	36.4 kg⋅m (357 N⋅m; 263 lbf⋅ft) @ 4,500 rpm		
LPG
Mu 2.7L LPi	2010–2012	6-speed automatic	165 PS (121 kW; 163 hp) @ 6,000 rpm	25 kg⋅m (245 N⋅m; 181 lbf⋅ft) @ 4,000 rpm		

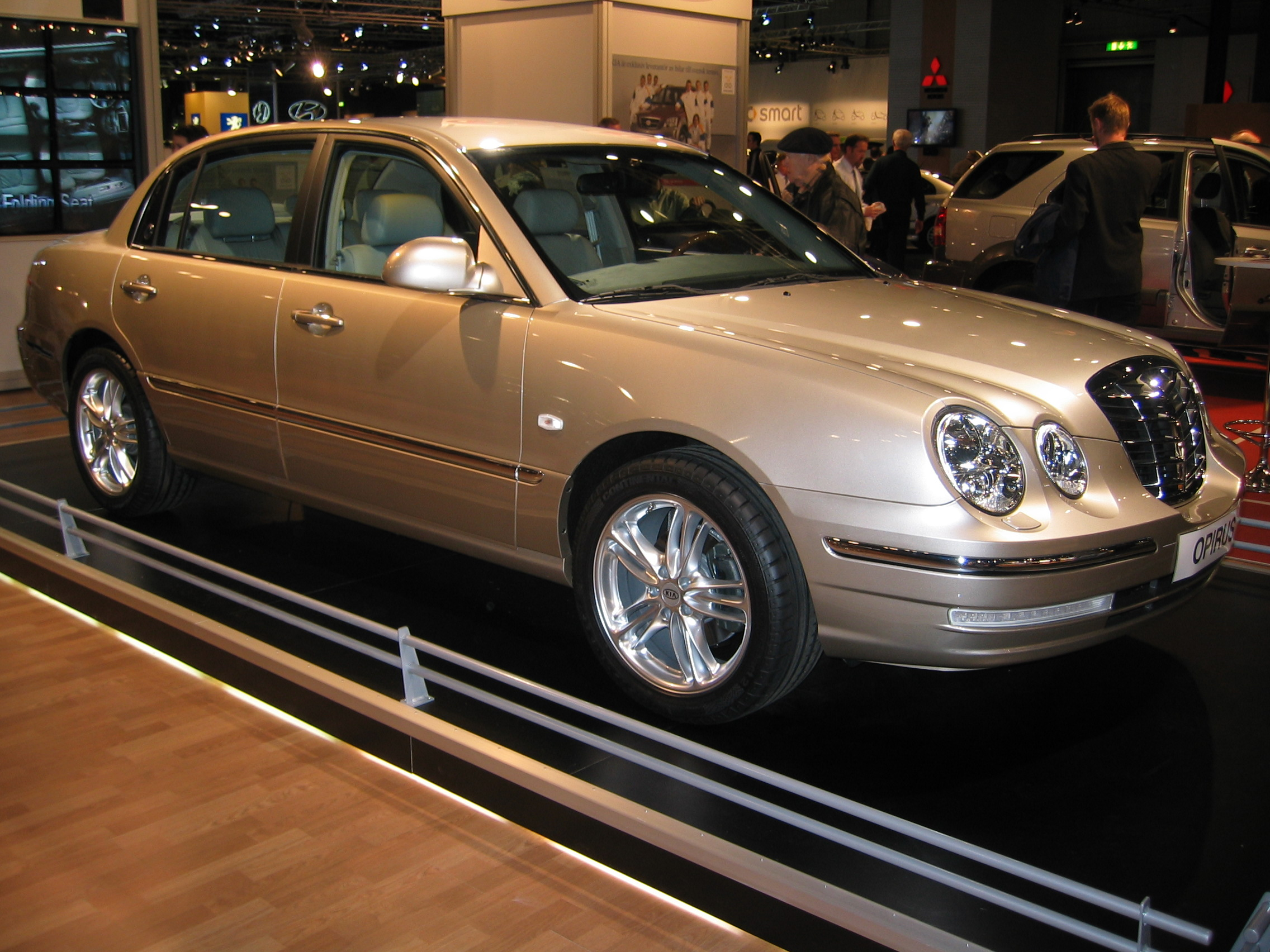
2003 Kia Opirus

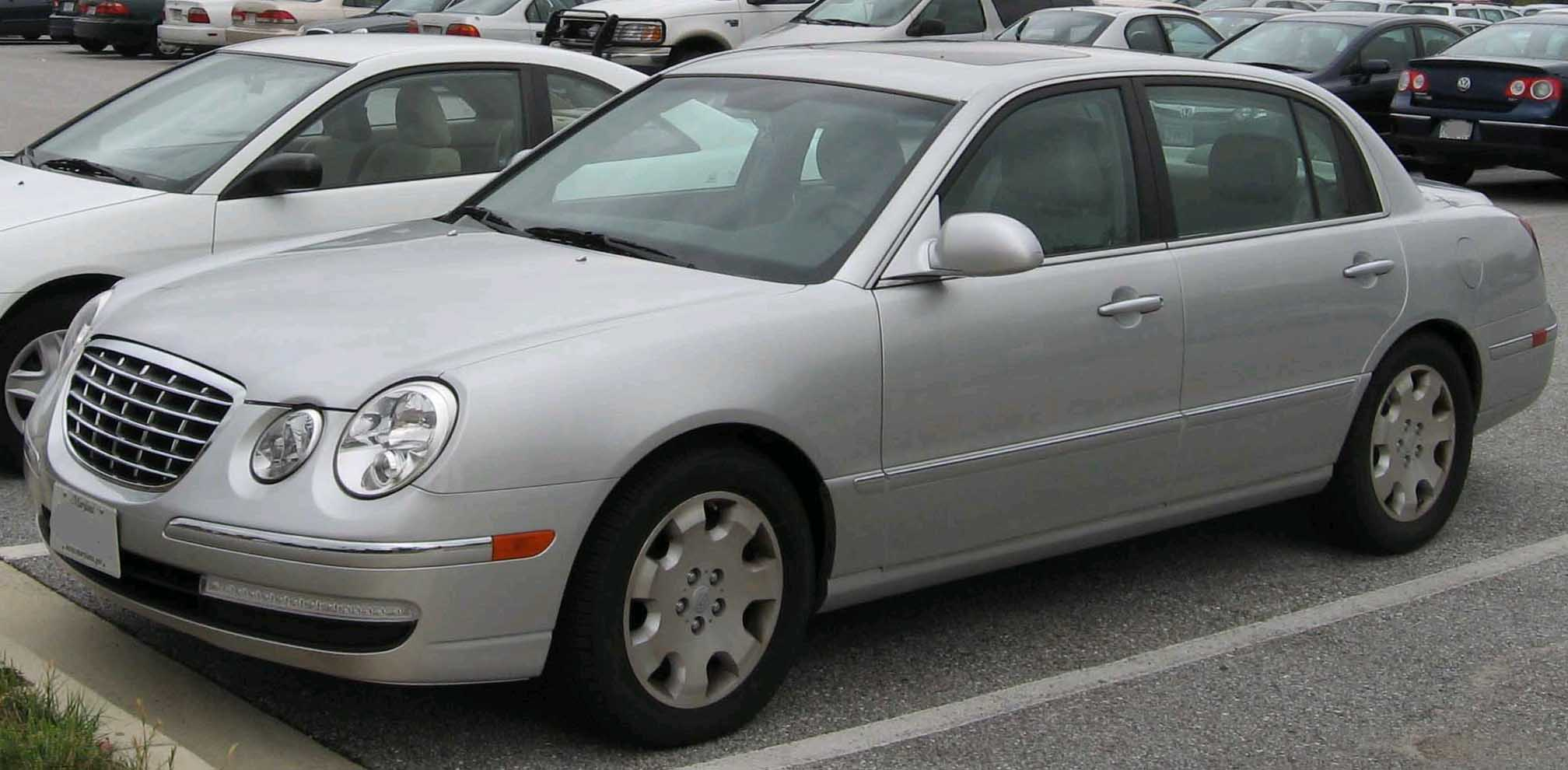
2007 Kia Amanti

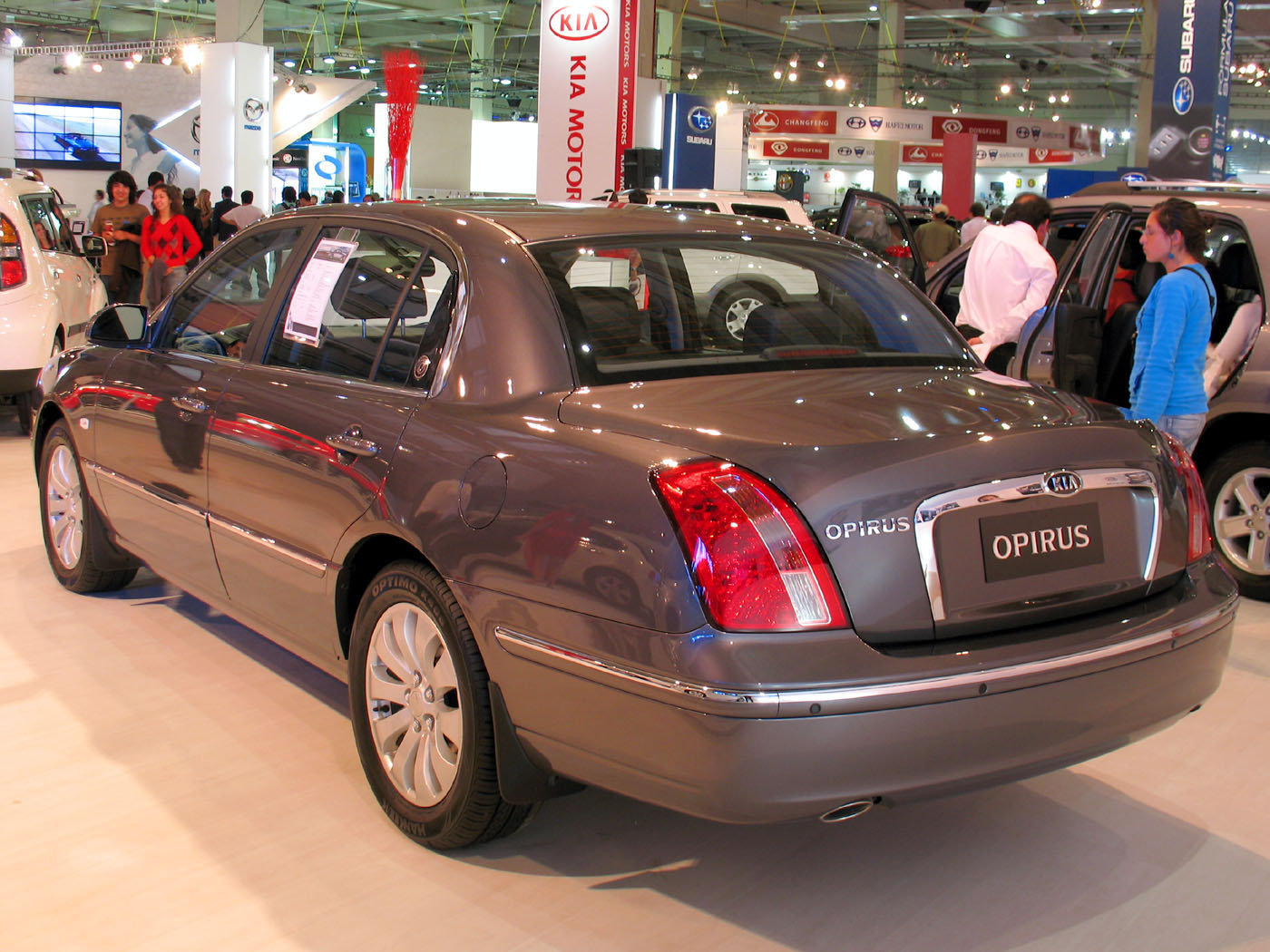
2008 Kia Opirus GL

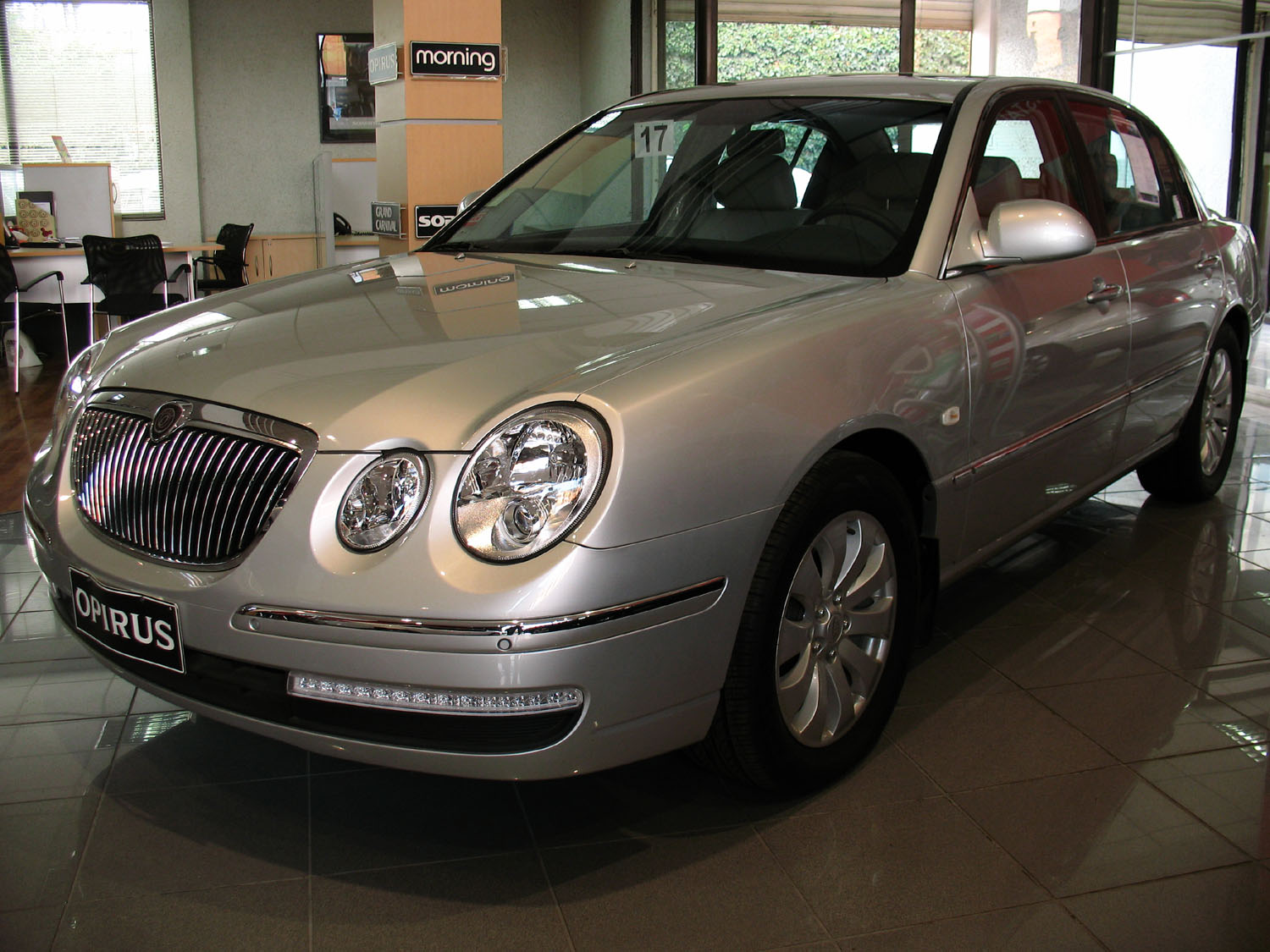
2009 Kia Opirus GL
