= Hyundai Transys =

South Korean automotive company

Hyundai Transys INC.
- Industry: Automotive
- Founded: January 2019; 7 years ago
- Headquarters: Seosan, South Chungcheong Province, South Korea
- Area served: Worldwide
- Products: Automotive parts
- Number of employees: 10,444 (2024)
- Parent: Hyundai Motor Group
- Website: www.hyundai-transys.com/ko/main.do

- Hyundai Transys
- Hangul: 현대트랜시스
- Hanja: 現代트랜시스
- RR: Hyeondae Teuraensiseu
- MR: Hyŏndae T'ŭraensisŭ

Hyundai Transys (Korean: 현대트랜시스) is a South Korean automotive parts company affiliated with the Hyundai Motor Group. The company mainly produces automatic transmissions and seats for automobiles. The headquarters is located in Seosan, South Chungcheong Province.

== History ==
The company began producing hybrid continuously variable transmissions in 2009. In 2008, the company established a powertrain corporation in Georgia, and began producing 650,000 transmissions per year. In 2014, the company established a seat corporation and began manufacturing more than 300,000 seats per year.

In 2019, Hyundai Dymos (현대다이모스) and Hyundai Powertech (현대파워텍) merged to form Hyundai Transys.

== Products ==
Hyundai Transys develops and produces automatic transmissions, manual transmissions, dual clutch transmissions, continuously variable transmission, hybrid transmissions, and electric vehicle reducers, and develops and produces hybrid drive systems and reducers for electric vehicles. The company supplies seats to Hyundai Motor, Kia, Rivian, and Lucid.

The company researches, develops, and produces powertrains and seats at 33 global business sites in 11 countries, including Korea, the United States, India, Germany, Czech Republic, Mexico, and Brazil.

== See also ==
- List of Hyundai transmissions
