= Genesis G90 =

Full-size luxury sedan (2015–present)

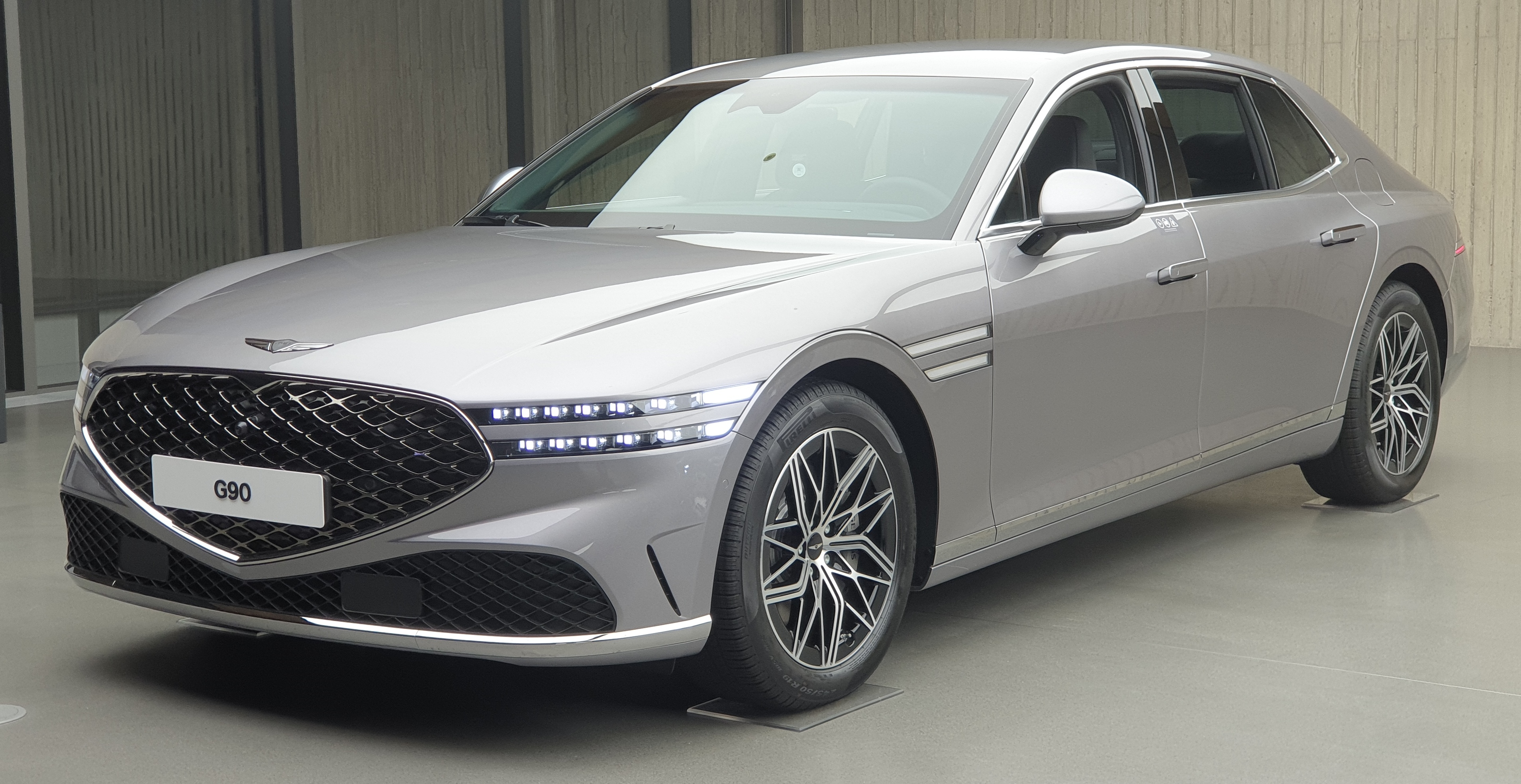

Overview
- Manufacturer: Genesis Motor (Hyundai)
- Production: 2015–present
- Model years: 2017–present

Body and chassis
- Class: Full-size luxury car (F)
- Body style: 4-door sedan
- Layout: Front-engine, rear-wheel-drive; Front-engine, all-wheel-drive

Chronology
- Predecessor: Hyundai Equus

The Genesis G90 (Korean: 제네시스 G90) is a full-size car manufactured since 2015 by the South Korean company Genesis, the luxury division of Hyundai Motor Company. It is the flagship model of the Genesis lineup. A four-door sedan, the G90 is the successor of the Hyundai Equus and was known as the Genesis EQ900 in South Korea from 2015 to 2019.

The G90 is the first flagship sedan introduced by the Genesis brand. The first generation was released in December 2015, and it went on sale in North America, Russia, and the Middle East in the second half of 2016. It began development in 2012, and was developed over a period of four years, with approximately 1,200 dedicated researchers working on the design and mass production stages. In November 2018, the facelifted EQ900 went on sale in the Korean market, and from this model onwards, it was also sold in Korea under the name G90.

The current model is the second generation released in 2021. In order to reduce the thickness of the headlamps and the size of the low beam lamps, the micro lens array (MLA) technology was introduced to cross-arrange the low beams, daytime running lights, turn signals, and high beams. The second generation is divided into a regular model and a Long Wheelbase (LWB) model, and the G90L has not currently been released.

== First generation (HI; 2015) ==
=== 2015–2018 ===
First generation
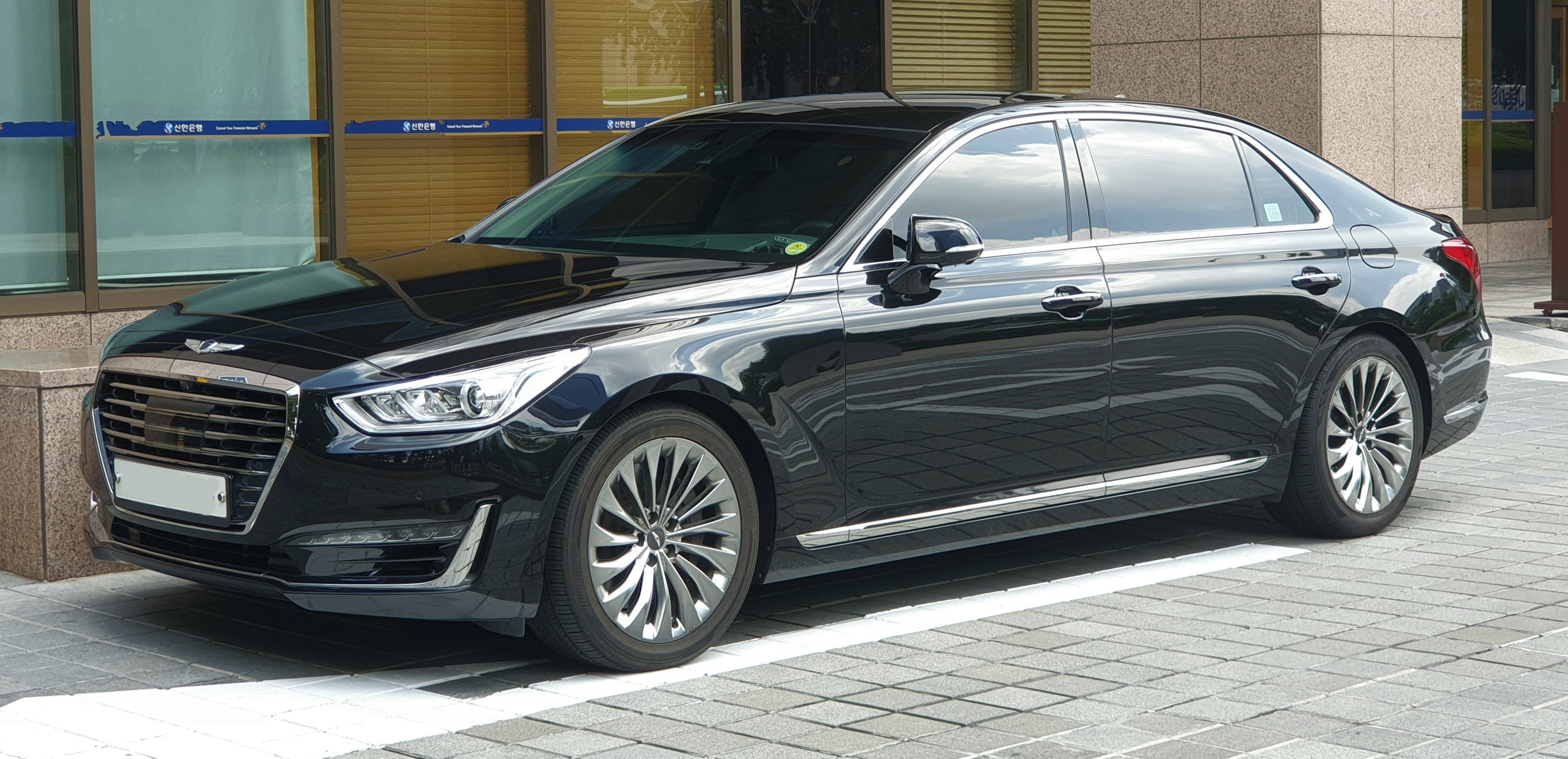
- Genesis EQ900 (South Korea; pre-facelift)

Overview
- Model code: HI
- Also called: Genesis EQ900 (pre-facelift)
- Production: November 2015 – 2021
- Model years: 2017–2022
- Assembly: South Korea: Ulsan; Russia: Kaliningrad (Avtotor)
- Designer: Under the lead of Peter Schreyer (pre-facelift); Under the lead of Luc Donckerwolke (facelift)

Body and chassis
- Platform: Hyundai M2
- Related: Genesis G80; Kia K9

Powertrain
- Engine: Gasoline: 3.3 L Lambda II T-GDI V6; 3.8 L Lambda II GDI V6; 5.0 L Tau GDI V8
- Transmission: 8-speed A8LR1/A8TR1 automatic

Dimensions
- Wheelbase: 3,160 mm (124.4 in); 3,450 mm (135.8 in) (limousine)
- Length: 5,205 mm (204.9 in); 5,495 mm (216.3 in) (limousine)
- Width: 1,915 mm (75.4 in)
- Height: 1,495 mm (58.9 in); 1,505 mm (59.3 in) (limousine)
- Curb weight: 1,995–2,140 kg (4,398–4,718 lb) (3.8); 2,060–2,185 kg (4,542–4,817 lb) (3.3T); 2,215–2,245 kg (4,883–4,949 lb) (5.0); 2,270–2,290 kg (5,004–5,049 lb) (limousine)

The Genesis G90 debuted in South Korea on December 9, 2015 as the Genesis EQ900. Its development, begun in 2012 under the project name HI, spanned four years with approximately 1,200 dedicated researchers working on the design and mass production stages. It was marketed in the Korean market under the name EQ900 until the facelift. The US market debut took place at the 2016 North American International Auto Show and went on sale in September 2016 at Genesis retailers as 2017 model year vehicles. Powertrains available included the 3.3T, 3.3T HTRAC, 5.0, 5.0 HTRAC.

The interior used materials crafted in collaboration with Italy's Pasubio leather concern, complemented by genuine wood accents and metallic materials for various control switches. The company described it as a vehicle that has entered the preliminary stage of a fully autonomous vehicle. It is equipped with a highway driving assistance system and a function that automatically adjusts speed for each section using the maximum speed limit information provided by the navigation system. The Genesis Adaptive Control Suspension (GACS) has been applied for the first time.

The base model Genesis G90 has a turbocharged, 3.3-liter V6 engine which makes 272 kW (365 hp) and 510 N⋅m (376 lb⋅ft) of torque. The G90 Ultimate has a 5.0-liter V8 with 313 kW (420 hp) and 519 N⋅m (383 lb⋅ft) of torque. All models have an eight-speed automatic transmission with shiftronic and is also available with rear-wheel drive or all-wheel drive (HTRAC).

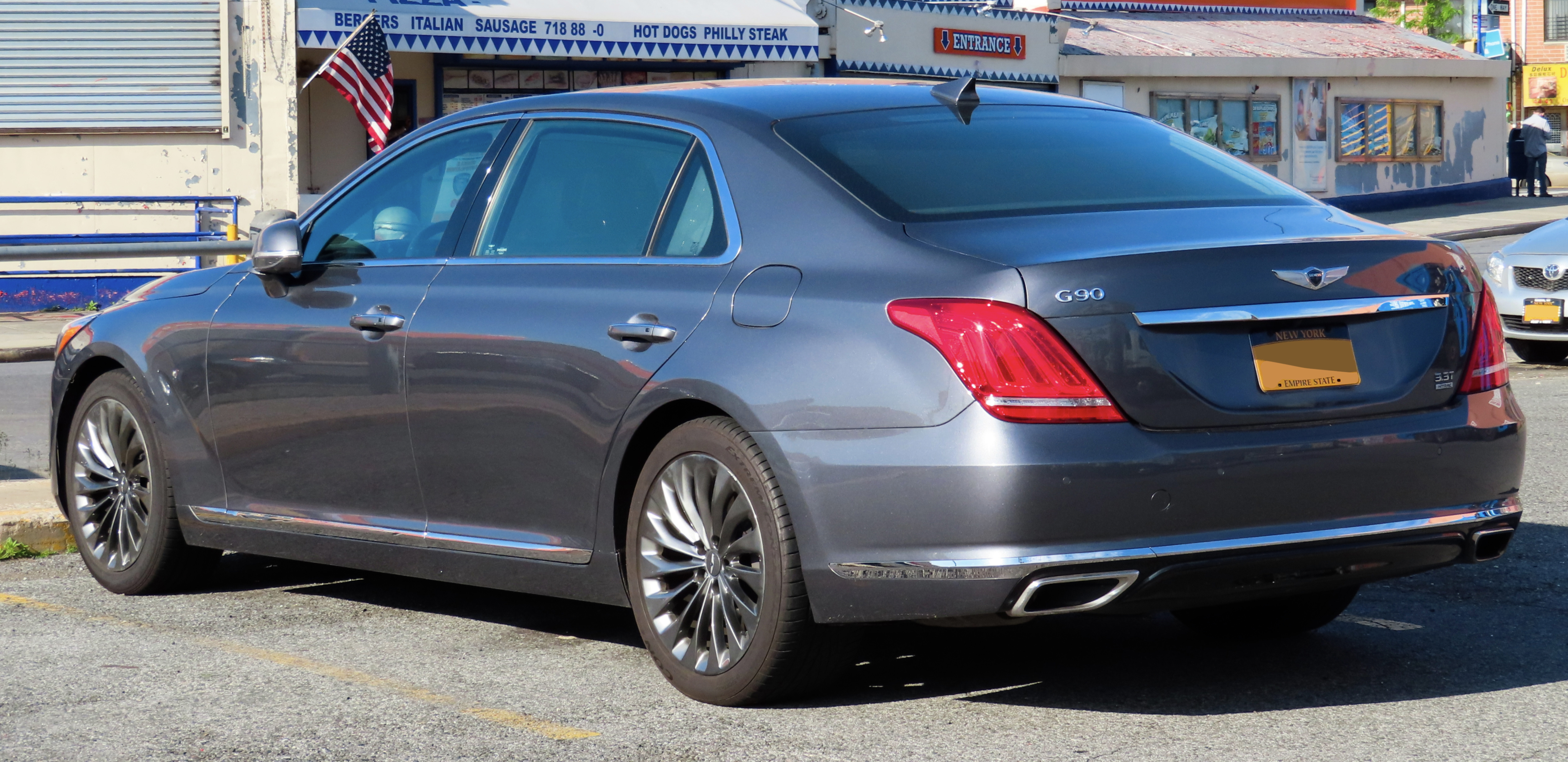
Genesis G90 3.3L (pre-facelift)

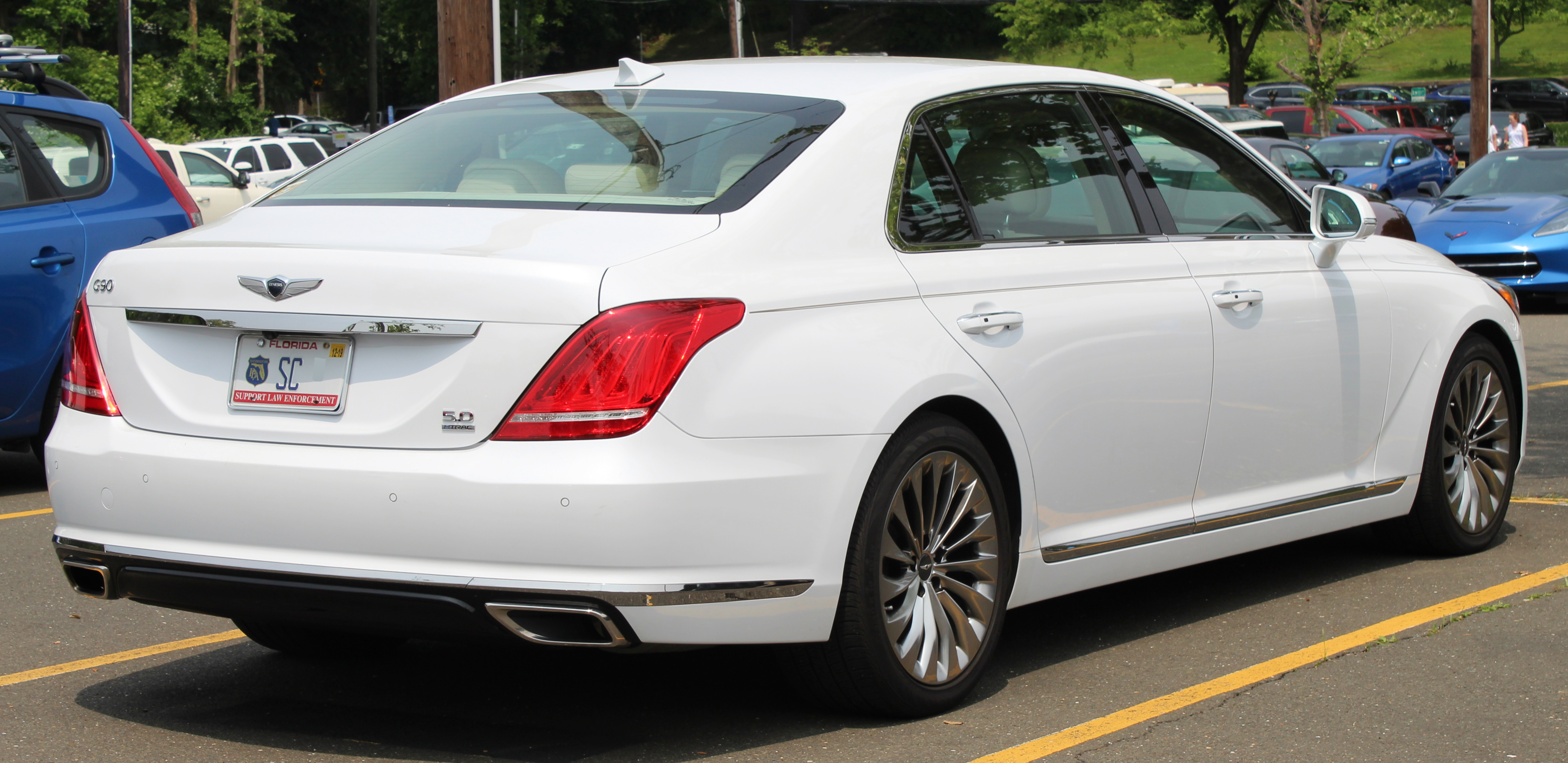
Genesis G90 5.0 (pre-facelift)

=== 2018–2022 ===
Genesis presented a restyled G90 on November 27, 2018. The EQ900 was also renamed the G90 for the Korean market.

The crest grille was changed from a pentagonal shape to a grid-like shape, and the headlights featured quad lamps, one of Genesis' signature design elements. Genesis described the exterior as an application of horizontal elements "to the entire vehicle to create a stable, yet majestic and dignified stance." The rear combination lamp had a design that spanned the entire rear, and a rear emblem featuring the English "GENESIS." It is the first Genesis vehicle equipped with automatic wireless navigation updates and intelligent vehicle management services, which automatically connect the vehicle to a server to update necessary information.

Acoustic performance has been improved via a system marketed as Active Noise Control that removes noise, and fuel efficiency has been improved by 2-3 % with a control device that automatically neutralizes the transmission when coasting without pressing the accelerator pedal.

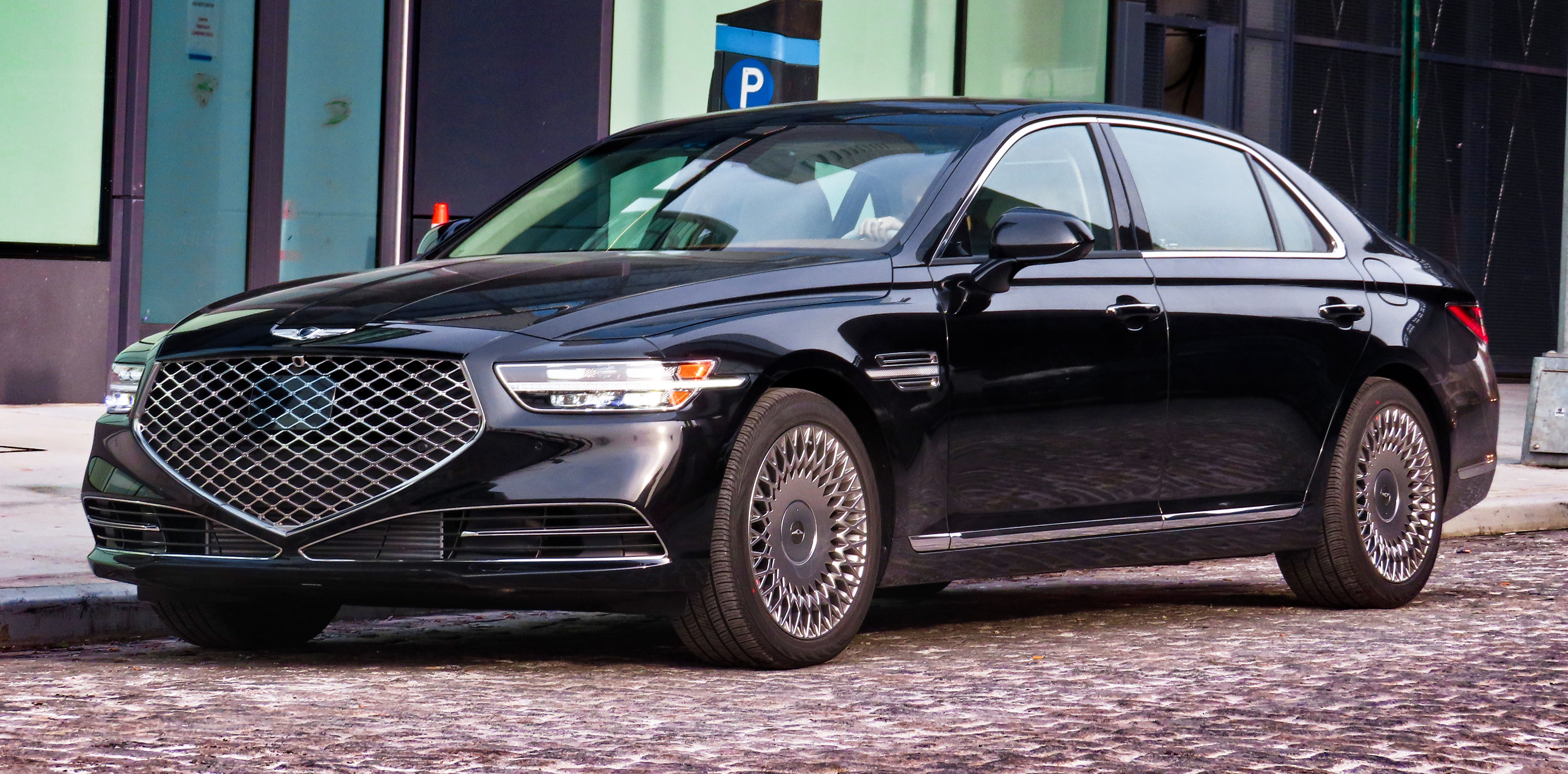
2020 Genesis G90 3.3T (facelift)

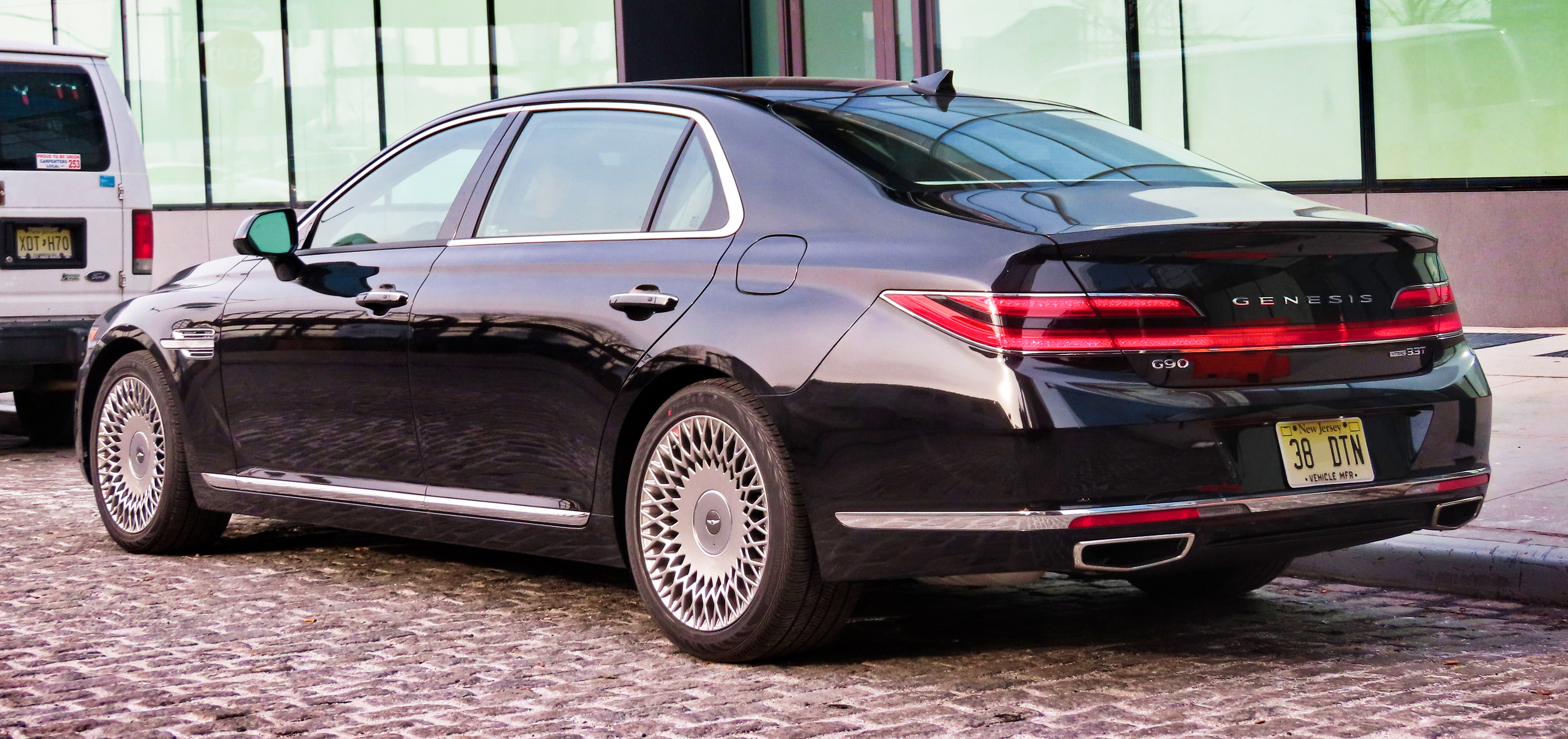
2020 Genesis G90 3.3T (facelift)

=== EQ900L/G90L ===
The G90L is a long wheelbase version of the G90. It was initially sold in Korea as the EQ900L and later renamed to the G90L after the 2018 exterior update. The G90L is available only as a V8 5.0L AWD (HTRAC).

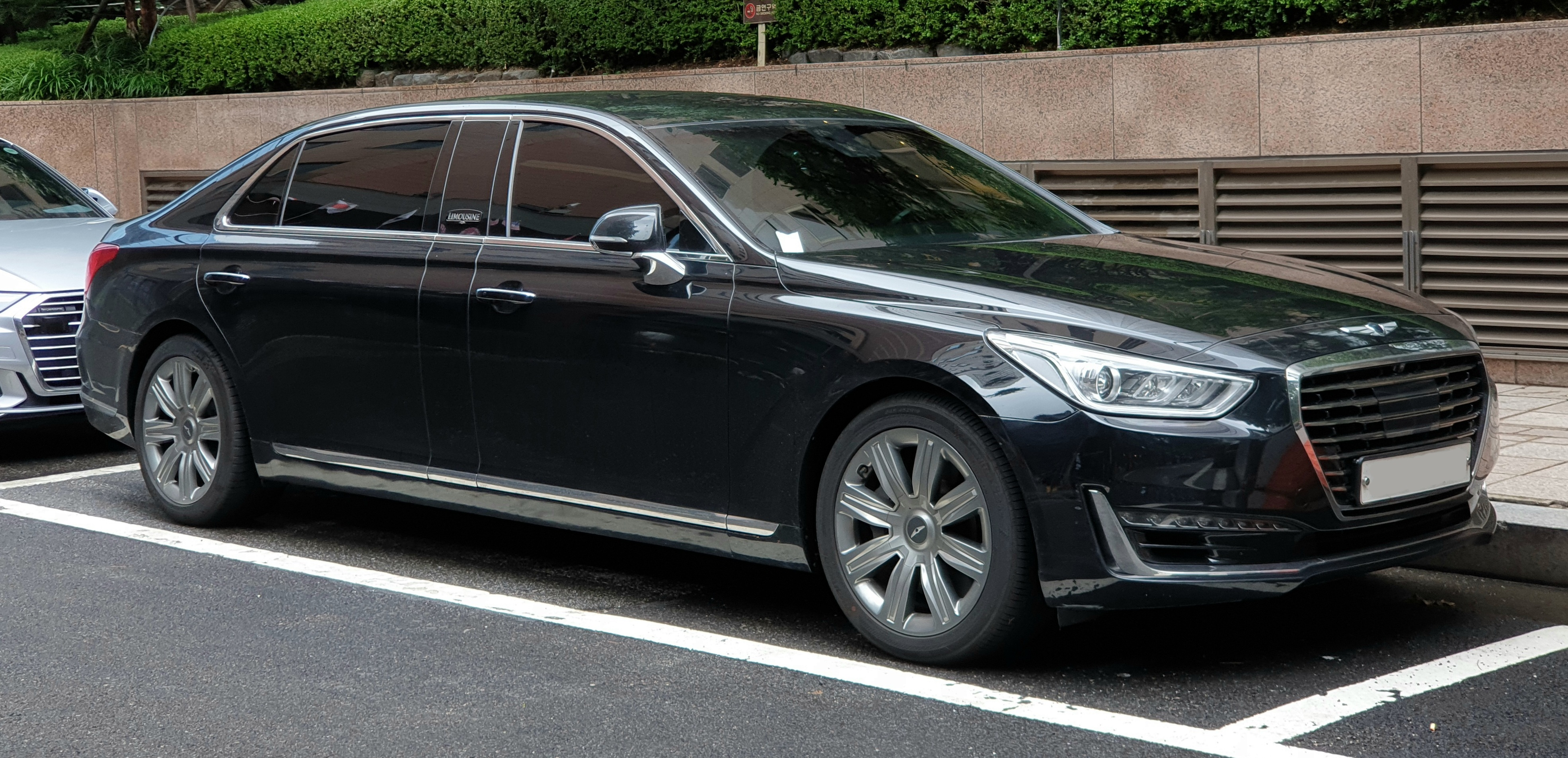
Genesis EQ900L (pre-facelift)

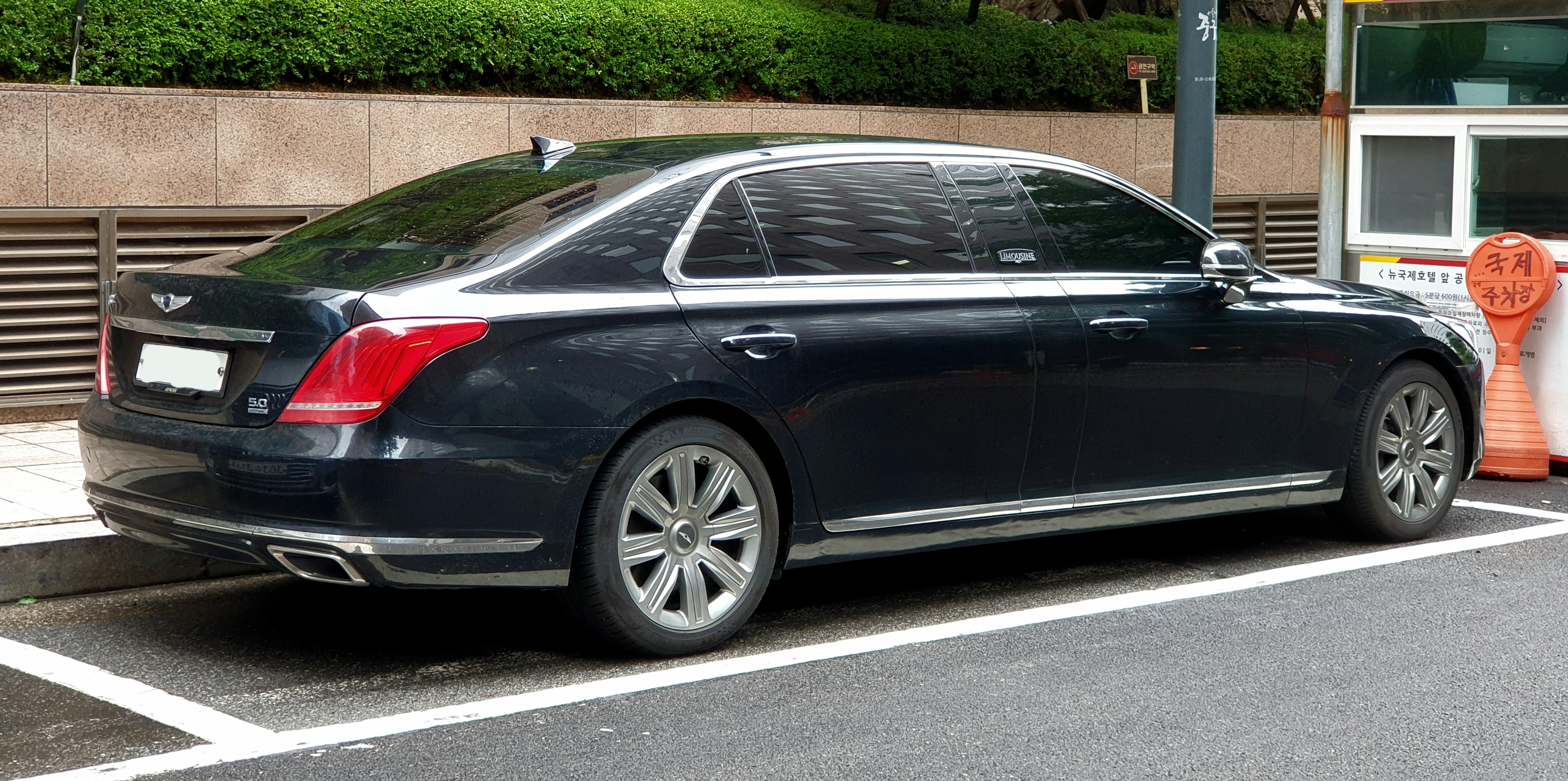
Genesis EQ900L (pre-facelift)
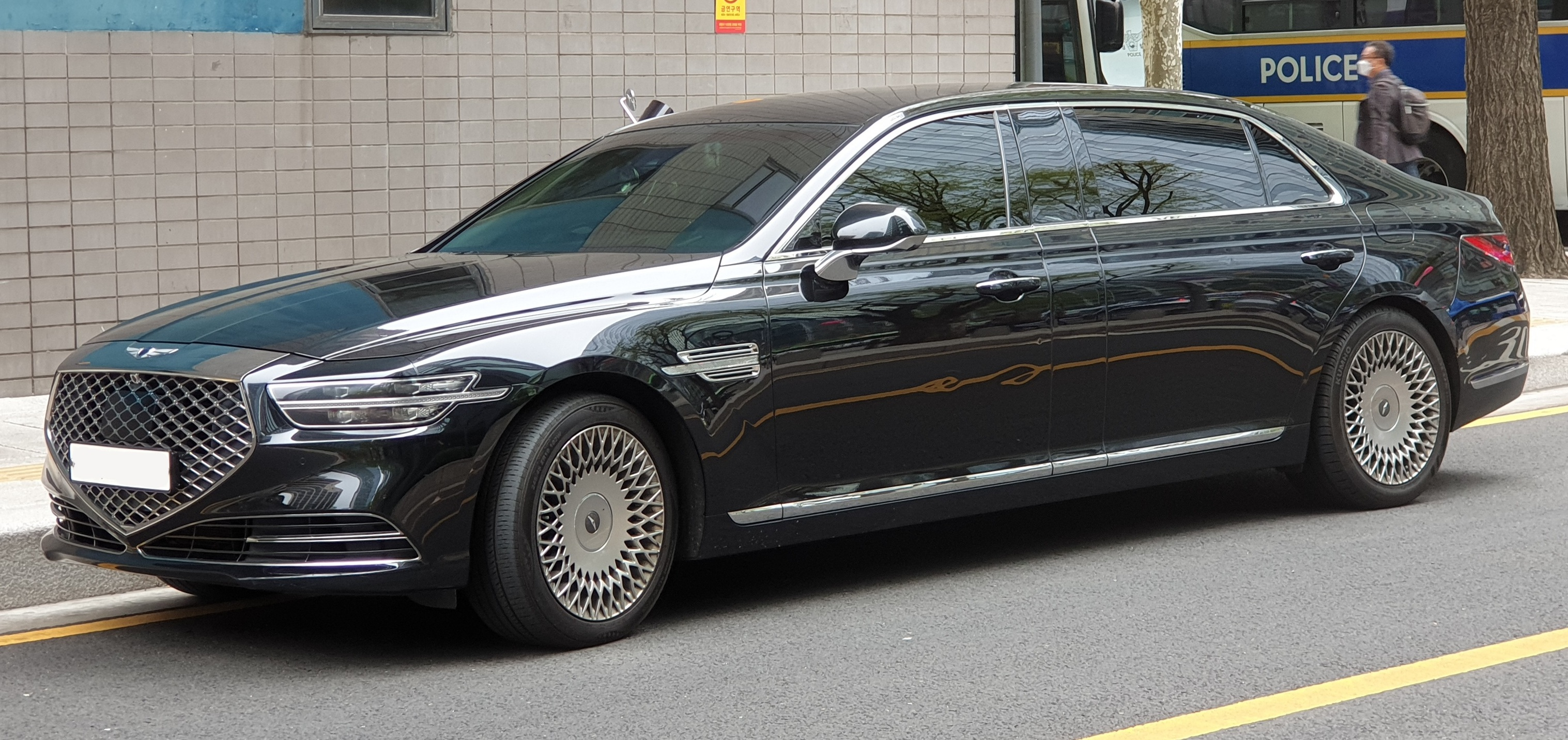
Genesis G90L (facelift)

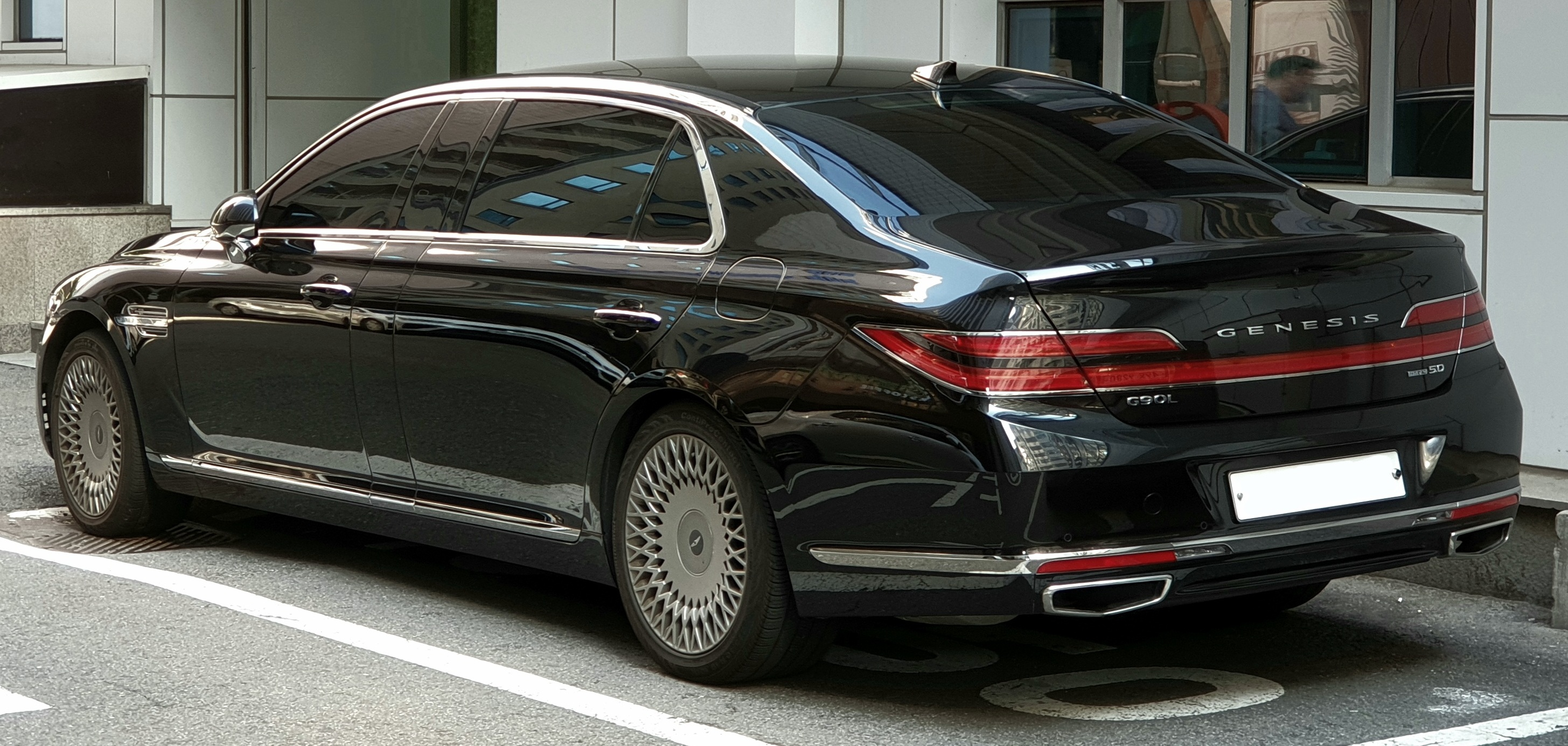
Genesis G90L (facelift)

=== Powertrain ===
Gasoline engines
Model	Years	Type/code	Power/rpm	Torque/rpm	0–100 km/h (0–62 mph) (Official)	Top Speed
3.3 Lambda II T-GDi	2015–2021	3,342 cc (203.9 cu in) V6 (G6DP)	272 kW; 365 hp (370 PS) at 6,000 rpm	52.4 kg⋅m (514 N⋅m; 379 lbf⋅ft) at 1,300–4,500 rpm	6.2s (RWD)	240 km/h (149 mph)
3.8 Lambda II GDi	2015–2021	3,778 cc (230.5 cu in) V6 (G6DN)	232 kW; 311 hp (315 PS) at 6,000 rpm	40.5 kg⋅m (397 N⋅m; 293 lbf⋅ft) at 5,000 rpm	6.9s (RWD)	240 km/h (149 mph)
5.0 Tau GDi	2015–2021	5,038 cc (307.4 cu in) V8 (G8BE)	304 kW; 407 hp (413 PS) at 6,000 rpm (Regular); 313 kW; 419 hp (425 PS) at 6,000 rpm (Premium)	51.4 kg⋅m (504 N⋅m; 372 lbf⋅ft) at 5,000 rpm (Regular); 53.0 kg⋅m (520 N⋅m; 383 lbf⋅ft) at 5,000 rpm (Premium)	5.7s (RWD)	240 km/h (149 mph)

== Second generation (RS4; 2021) ==
Second generation
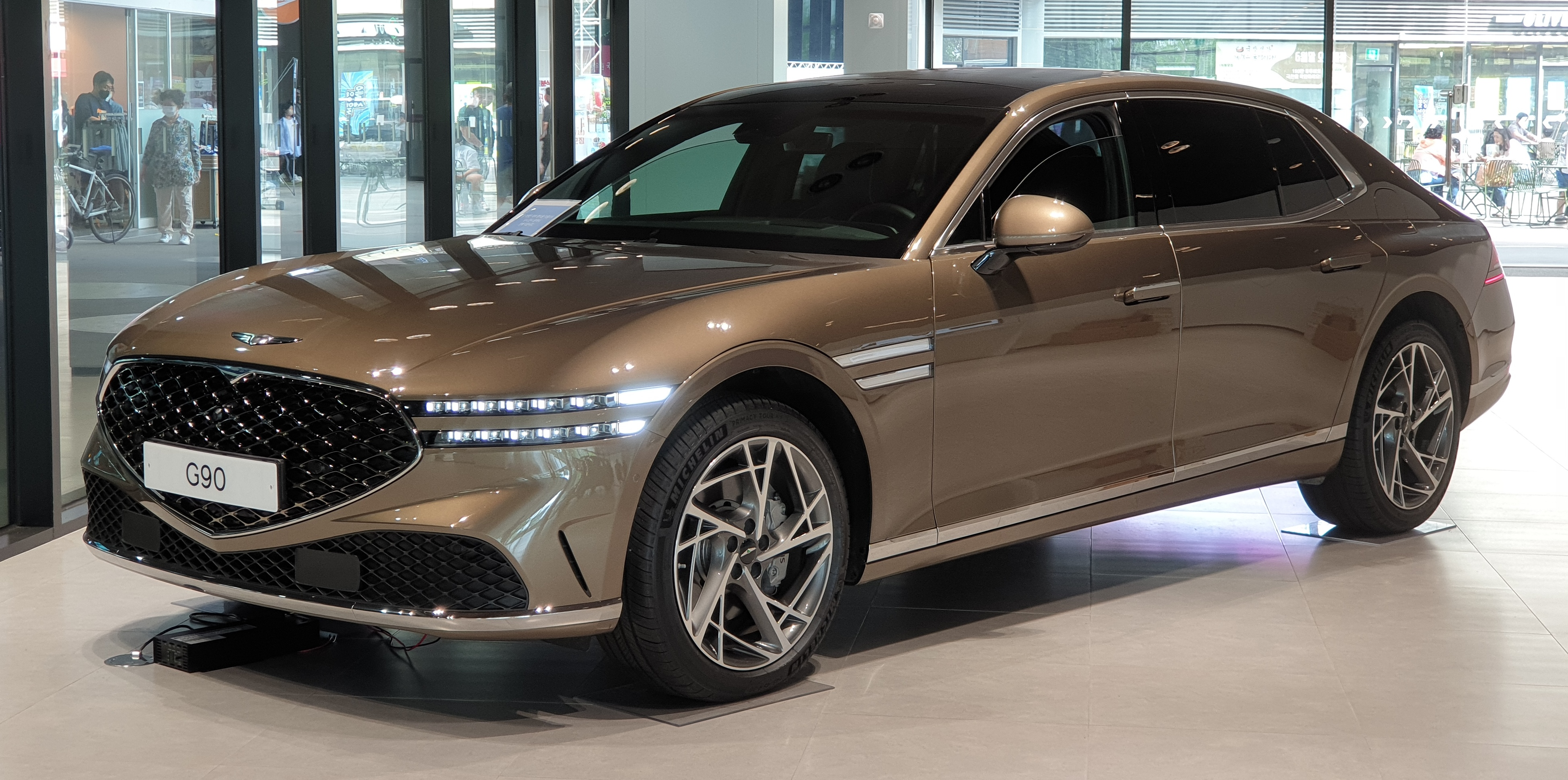

Overview
- Model code: RS4
- Production: December 2021 – present
- Model years: 2023–present
- Assembly: South Korea: Ulsan
- Designer: Under the lead of Luc Donckerwolke

Body and chassis
- Platform: Hyundai M3

Powertrain
- Engine: Gasoline: 3.5 L Smartstream G3.5 T-GDi V6; 3.5 L Smartstream G3.5 T-GDi e-S/C V6
- Transmission: 8-speed A8TR1 automatic

Dimensions
- Wheelbase: 3,180 mm (125.2 in); 3,370 mm (132.7 in) (LWB)
- Length: 5,275 mm (207.7 in); 5,465 mm (215.2 in) (LWB)
- Width: 1,930 mm (76.0 in)
- Height: 1,490 mm (58.7 in)
- Curb weight: 2,025–2,175 kg (4,464–4,795 lb); 2,295–2,345 kg (5,060–5,170 lb) (LWB)

The exterior design was presented on November 30, 2021. Genesis' family look, a two-line lamp was applied, and Layered Architecture has been applied to the Crest Grille. The cube-shaped projection light incorporates a white light, a daytime driving light, and a direction indicator light. Two rows of rear lamps are also long on the back, and the low beam headlights feature approximately 200 micro optic lenses per module. The side design features a feature Line that starts from the hood and continues along the bottom of the window to the trunk, and a feature line on the fender that wraps around the wheel.

The second-generation G90 was released in two models: a general model and a long-wheelbase model. The electronic gear shift control is equipped with a function that prevents incorrect operation by vibrating when the reverse gear is repeatedly operated. As a global first, the G90 featured Virtual Venue, a virtual 3D surround sound function through a Bang & Olufsen 23 speaker 3D sound system.

Power comes from a 3.5-liter twin-turbo V6 with 380 PS (279 kW; 375 hp) and 54 kg⋅m (530 N⋅m; 391 lbf⋅ft) in the base car. The long-wheelbase model is further supported by a 48-volt mild hybrid system with an electric supercharger for additional power. All-wheel drive is standard on the long-wheelbase model. It is equipped with a multi-chamber air suspension that adjusts the stiffness of the air spring into three stages depending on driving conditions and drive mode. Active Rear-Wheel Steering (RWS) reduces the turning radius by turning the rear wheels 4 degrees in the opposite direction of the front wheels when making a U-turn and by 2 degrees when changing lanes.

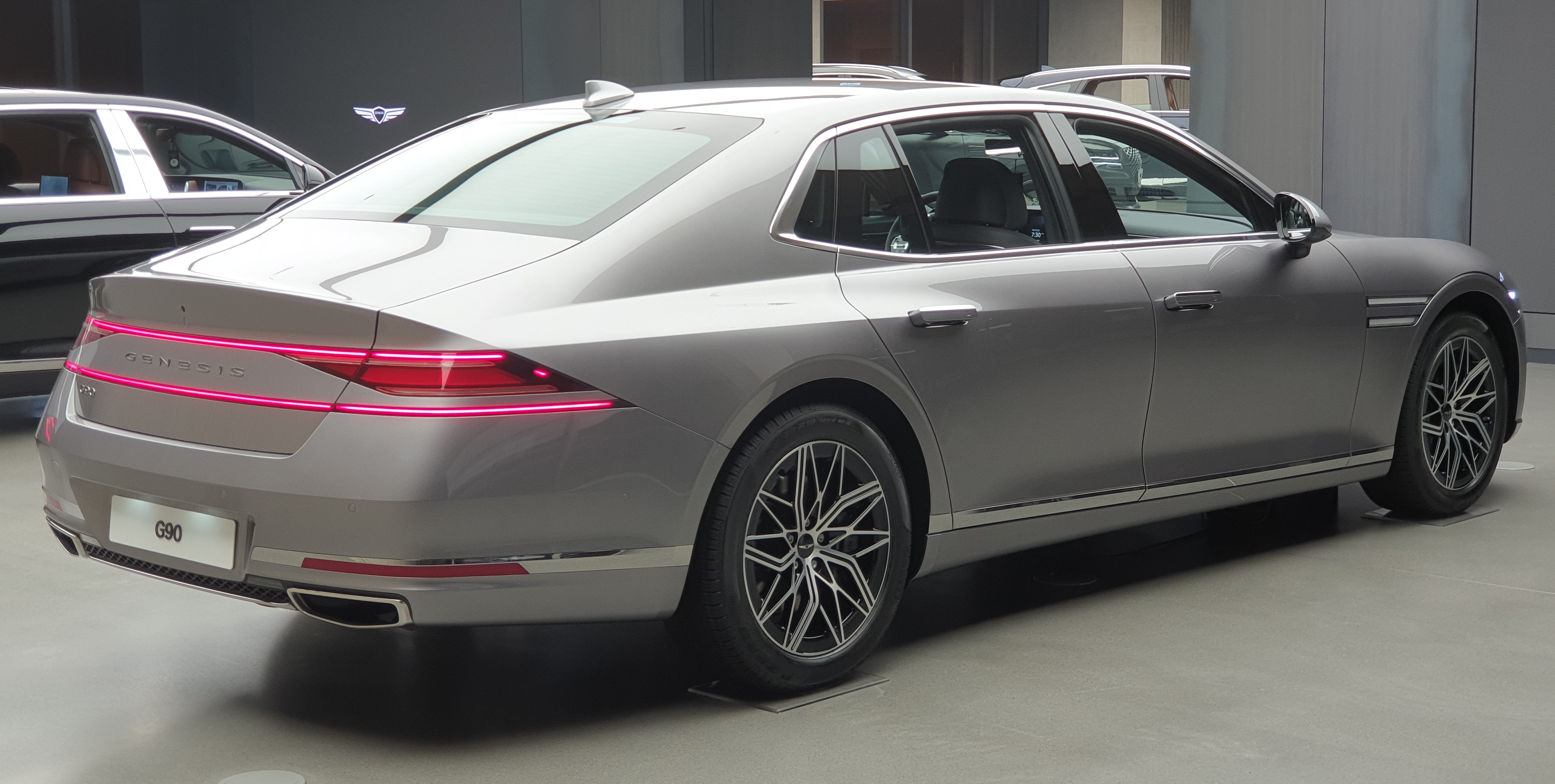
Rear

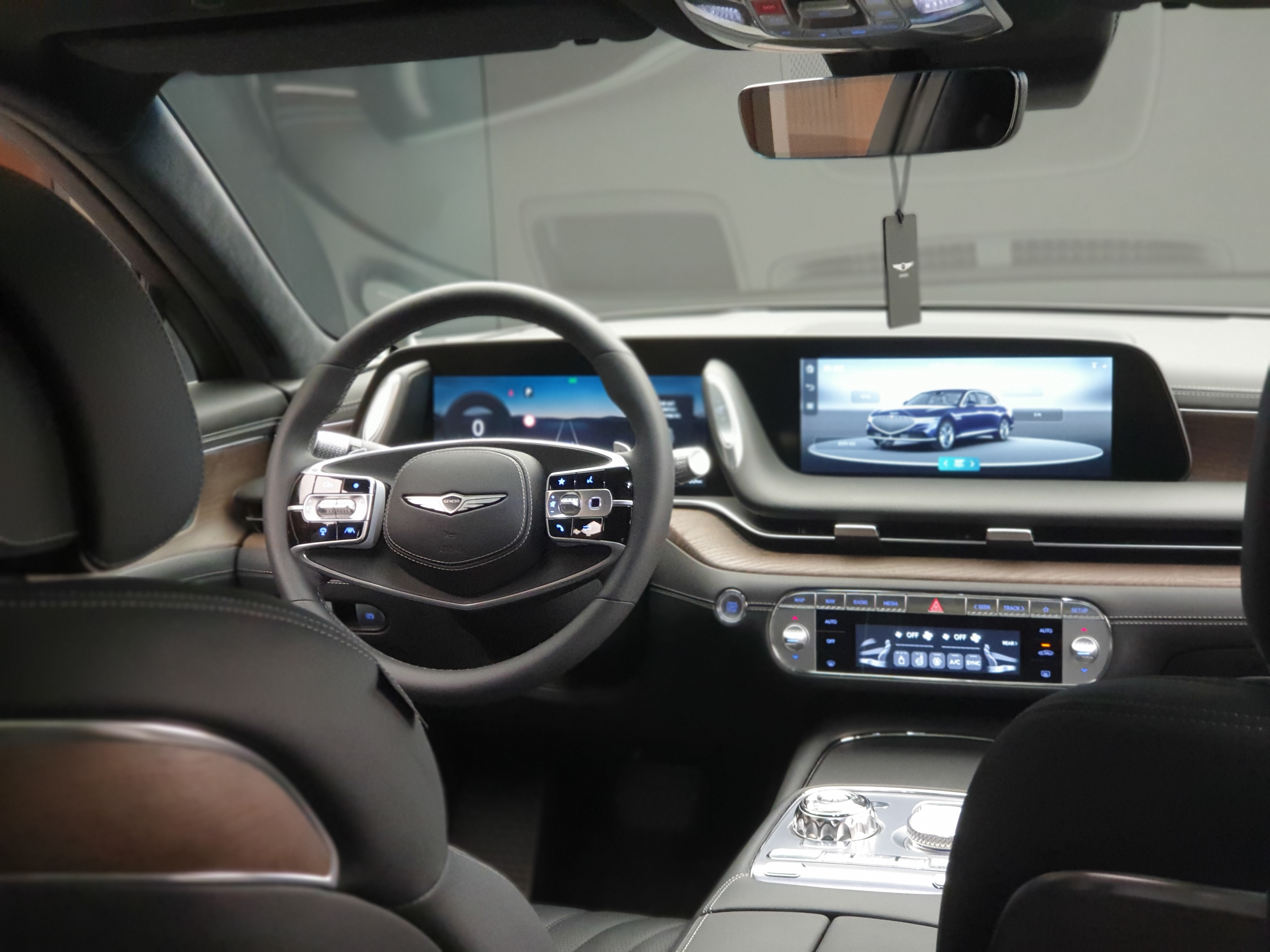
Interior

=== Long Wheelbase (LWB) ===
The second-generation G90 is available in a long wheelbase, which gains an additional 190 mm (7.5 in) over the standard car. It is equipped with a gasoline 3.5 turbo engine that is the first Genesis model to feature a 48 V electric supercharger, e-S/C.

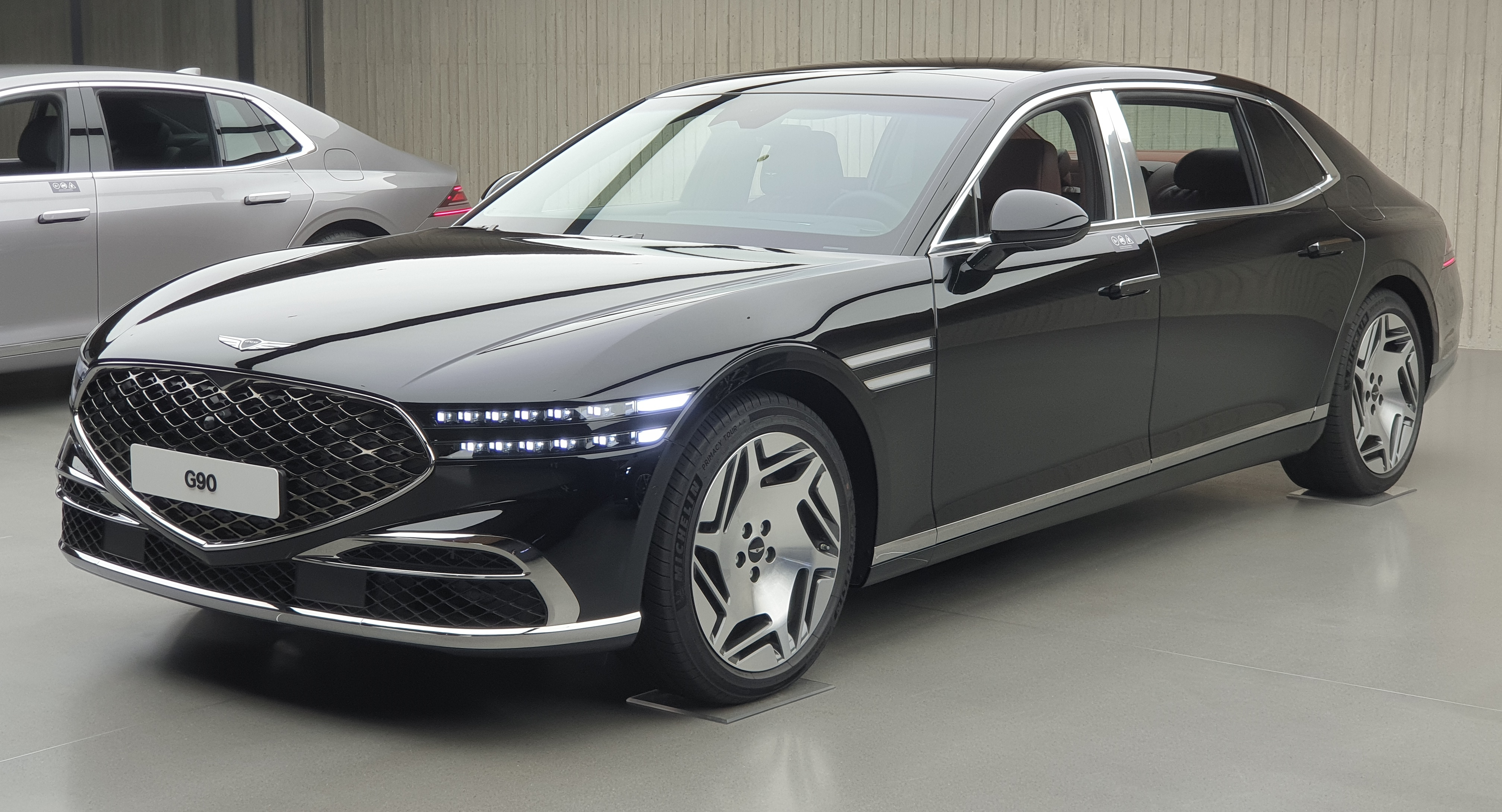
Genesis G90 (LWB)

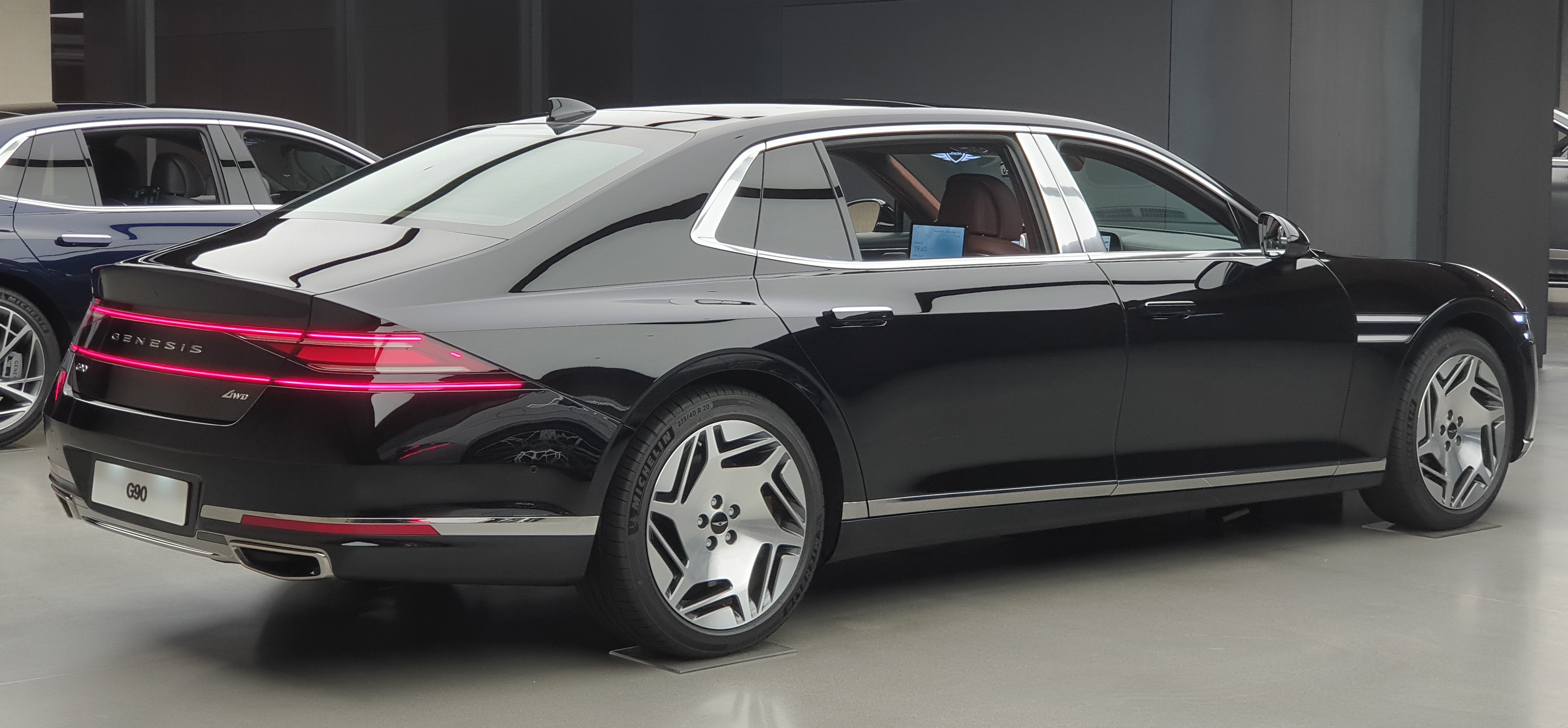
Genesis G90 (LWB)

=== Powertrain ===
Specs
Model	Years	Type	Transmission	Power/rpm	Torque/rpm	0–100 km/h (0–62 mph) (Official)	Top Speed
Smartstream G3.5 T-GDi	2021–present	3,470 cc (212 cu in) V6	8-speed automatic	279 kW; 375 hp (380 PS) at 5,800 rpm	54 kg⋅m (530 N⋅m; 391 lbf⋅ft) at 1,300–4,500 rpm		
Smartstream G3.5 T-GDi e-S/C	2022–present	3,470 cc (212 cu in) V6	8-speed automatic	305 kW; 409 hp (415 PS) at 5,800 rpm	56 kg⋅m (549 N⋅m; 405 lbf⋅ft) at 1,300–4,500 rpm	5.2s (SWB); 5.4s (LWB)	250 km/h (155 mph)

== Sales ==
As of November 2015, a day after pre-order began, pre-orders of EQ900 in South Korea reached 4,342 units. As December 2015, pre-orders of G90 exceeded 10,000 units.

Year	South Korea	U.S.	Canada	China	Global
2015	384	—N/a	—N/a		384
2016	23,275	782	38		26,109
2017	12,271	4,398	92		17,286
2018	9,709	2,136	81		12,236
2019	17,542	2,239	82		19,746
2020	10,009	2,072	59		12,283
2021	5,089	1,821	57		7,216
2022	23,229	1,172	13		24,925
2023	12,479	1,288	47	40	14,500
2024	8,031	1,503	22	57	10,111
2025				18	
