= Hyundai Motor Manufacturing Alabama =

Automobile factory in Montgomery, Alabama, USA

Hyundai Motor Manufacturing Alabama, LLC
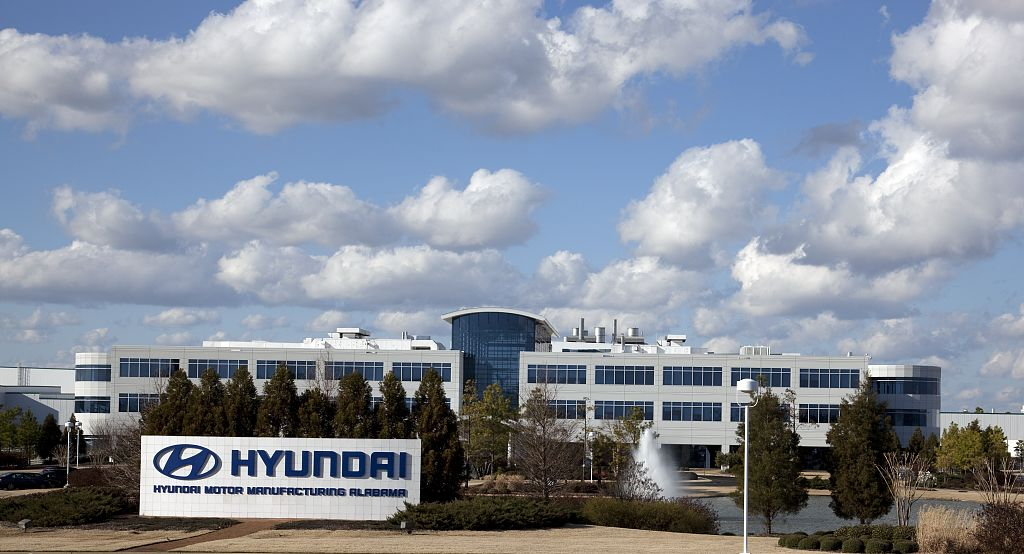
- The factory as seen in March 2010
- Built: 2004
- Operated: May 2005; 21 years ago
- Location: Montgomery, Alabama
- Coordinates: 32.281981°N 86.328442°W
- Industry: Automotive
- Products: Automobiles
- Owner: Hyundai Motor Company
- Website: hmmausa.com

Hyundai Motor Manufacturing Alabama (commonly called HMMA) is an automobile factory in Montgomery, Alabama.

== History ==
It was incorporated as a subsidiary of Hyundai Motor Company of South Korea on April 12, 2002. Construction completed in June 2004, with the official start of production beginning in May 2005. The official grand opening ceremony on May 20, 2005, was attended by former President of the United States, George H. W. Bush and Hyundai Motor Group Chairman, Chung Mong-koo. It employed approximately 3,000 workers in 2013. Hyundai announced that the initial investment in the plant as $1.1 billion but the current investment is $1.7 billion. In May 2011, HMMA announced a $173 million investment to increase the capacity of the engine assembly plant.

In May 2018, HMMA announced an investment of $388 million to construct a plant dedicated to manufacturing engine heads and enhance existing operations to support production of existing models. In November 2019, HMMA announced the Santa Cruz compact utility vehicle would join the Santa Fe SUV and the Sonata and Elantra sedans, starting in 2021. The concept version of the Santa Cruz was unveiled at the 2015 Detroit International Auto Show. A $410 million expansion will support the addition of the Santa Cruz pickup. Santa Cruz production at HMMA began in June 2021. In August 2021, HMMA celebrated the production of its five millionth vehicle. In April 2022, HMMA announced the Hyundai Santa Fe Hybrid and Genesis GV70 EV electric vehicle would be produced at HMMA. The Santa Fe Hybrid will begin production in October 2022 and the Electrified GV70 will roll off the assembly line in December 2022. Genesis Motor, LLC, commonly referred to as "Genesis" (Korean: 제네시스, romanized: Jenesiseu), is the luxury vehicle division of Hyundai.

== Operation ==
When it was built, the plant was expected to generate an additional 5,500 jobs and $500 million in investments from suppliers. Many of the suppliers were already in the region supplying the Mercedes, Honda and Toyota plants in the state. The plant has capacity for 400,000 vehicles and 700,000 engines per year. Hyundai Glovis operates the rail shipping yard.

The success of the HMMA plant and the availability of local suppliers led Hyundai to invest over $1 billion in a new Kia Motors plant in West Point, Georgia. The West Point Kia plant is just over the Alabama state line, less than 85 miles away from the Montgomery plant. The two plants are directly linked by Interstate 85 in Alabama. Through the years some production has been shifted between the two plants. For example, Kia engines are made in the HMMA plant while some SUV production was moved from Hyundai to the West Point Kia plant. HMMA increased SUV production between 2012 and 2018.

== Products ==
=== Vehicles ===
- Hyundai Santa Fe - MY2007 to MY2010 / 2016 to present
- Hyundai Tucson - MY2022 to present
- Hyundai Santa Cruz - MY2022 to present
- Genesis Electrified GV70 - MY2023 to present

=== Engines ===
- Hyundai Theta engine (Theta II engine)
- Hyundai Nu engine
- Hyundai Smartstream engine (G1.6 T-GDi, G2.0 Atkinson, G2.5 GDi & G2.5 T-GDi)

=== Former products ===
- Hyundai Sonata - MY2006 to MY2022
- Hyundai Elantra - MY2011 to MY2023
- Hyundai Lambda engine (until March 2011)

== Controversies ==
In July 2022, Reuters reported that SMART, a nearby Hyundai subsidiary that supplies parts to the Montgomery factory, had hired underage workers as young as 12 years old to work in one of its metal stamping plants. In response, Hyundai said it "does not tolerate illegal employment practices at any Hyundai entity." State and federal laws limit minors younger than 18 from working in metal stamping and pressing jobs near dangerous machinery.

== See also ==
- List of Hyundai Motor Company manufacturing facilities
