= Hyundai Santa Cruz =

Compact pickup truck

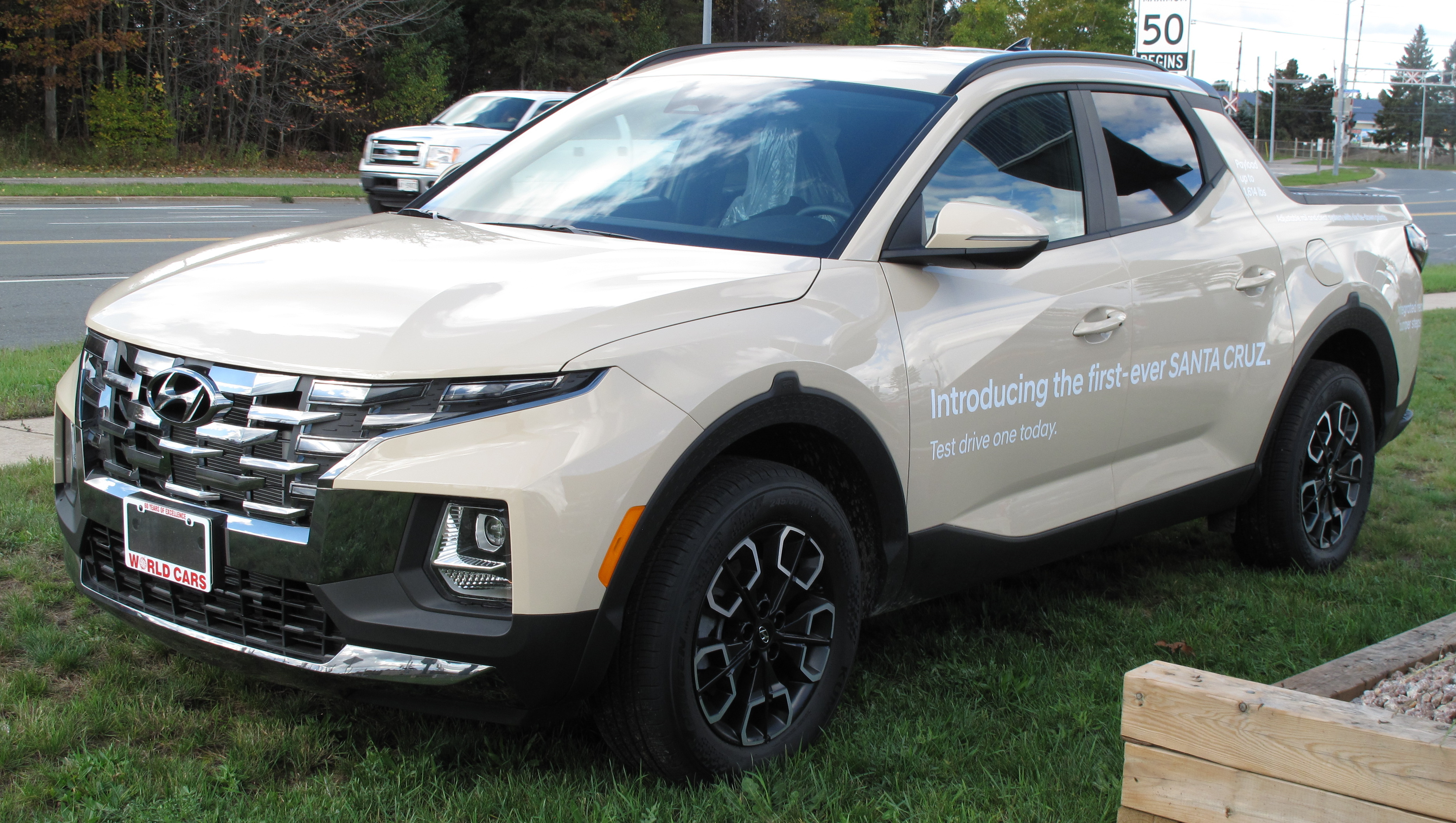
- 2022 Hyundai Santa Cruz (pre-facelift)

Overview
- Manufacturer: Hyundai
- Model code: NX4a OB
- Production: June 2021 – present
- Model years: 2022–present
- Assembly: United States: Montgomery, Alabama (HMMA)

Body and chassis
- Class: Compact pickup truck
- Body style: 4-door pickup
- Layout: Front-engine, front-wheel-drive or all-wheel-drive (HTRAC)
- Platform: Hyundai-Kia N3
- Chassis: Unibody
- Related: Hyundai Tucson (NX4)

Powertrain
- Engine: Gasoline: 2.5 L Smartstream G2.5 GDi I4 (US only); 2.5 L Smartstream G2.5 T-GDi I4
- Transmission: 8-speed A8F27 automatic 8-speed D8LF1 dual-clutch automatic

Dimensions
- Wheelbase: 3,005 mm (118.3 in)
- Length: 4,970 mm (195.7 in)
- Width: 1,905 mm (75.0 in)
- Height: 1,695 mm (66.7 in)
- Curb weight: 1,680–1,870 kg (3,704–4,123 lb)

The Hyundai Santa Cruz is a four-door compact pickup truck manufactured and marketed by Hyundai. Released in 2021 for the 2022 model year, the Santa Cruz is the first four-door pickup truck sold by Hyundai in the North American market. The vehicle is based on the Tucson crossover SUV, and uses a unibody chassis design.

Industry analysts expected the Santa Cruz to attract car or crossover SUV buyers instead of people who have owned a larger, traditional pickup truck. Hyundai is to reportedly discontinue production of the Santa Cruz in 2026.

== Overview ==
The Santa Cruz was previewed by a concept pickup truck at the 2015 North American International Auto Show with the same name.

The production model debuted in April 2021 for the North American market. Marketed as a "Sport Adventure Vehicle", it is closely related to the fourth-generation Tucson, sharing the same project code (NX4, with additional 'a' to denote American production and 'OB' suffix, meaning 'open bed'), production site, and dashboard design. It also features a similar styling introduced on the fourth-generation Tucson, with its front end dominated by the grille with integrated daytime running lights.

The Santa Cruz uses a front-wheel-drive configuration as the base model, with an available upgrade to the HTRAC all-wheel-drive system. The HTRAC system allows for the rear wheels to receive up to 50 percent of the drive power via a lockable clutched center differential. It is equipped with MacPherson struts for the front wheels and a multi-link independent suspension in the rear. The rear suspension is equipped with self-leveling shock absorbers to keep the truck level even when there is weight on the bed or a trailer on the hitch.

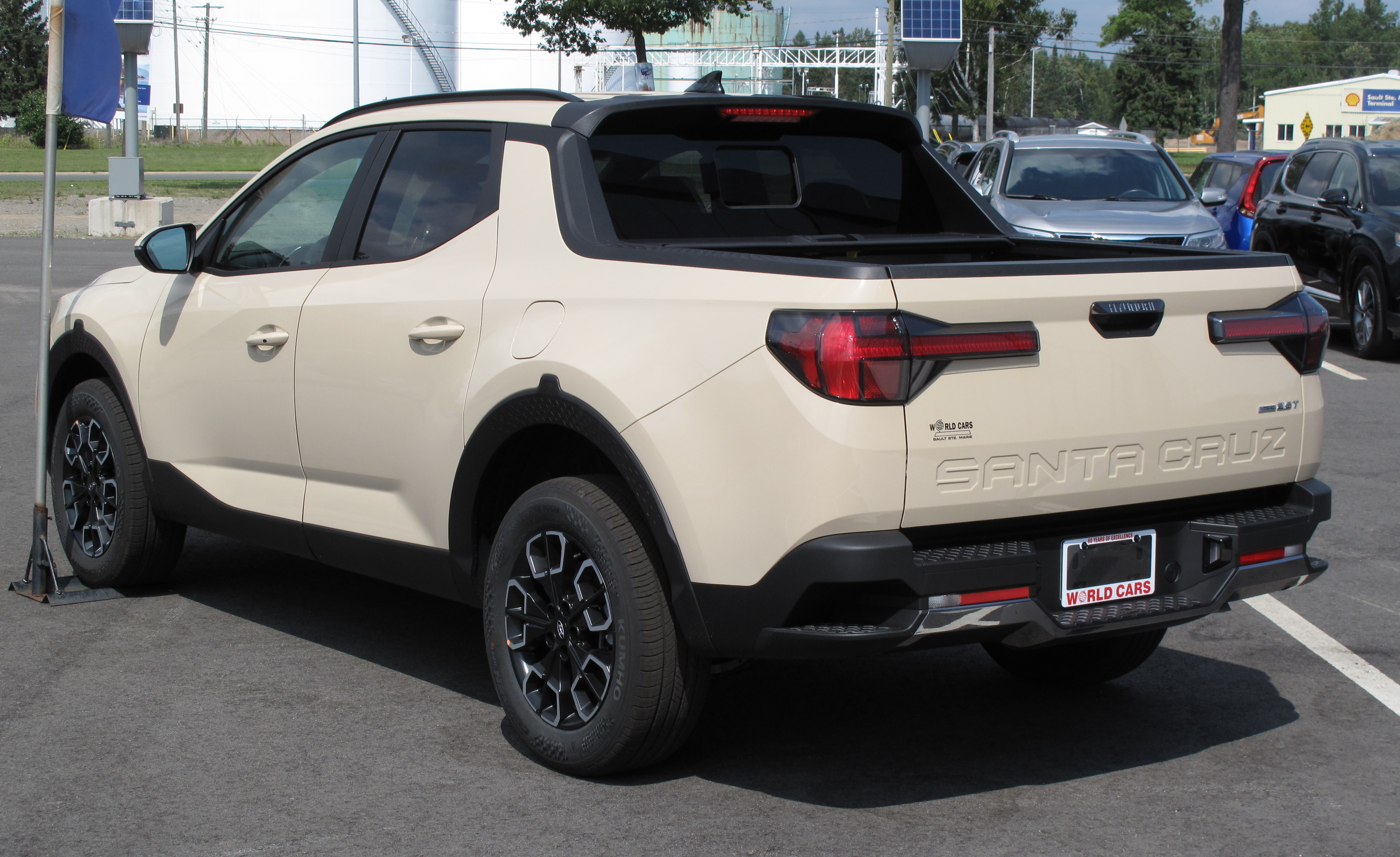
Rear view (pre-facelift)

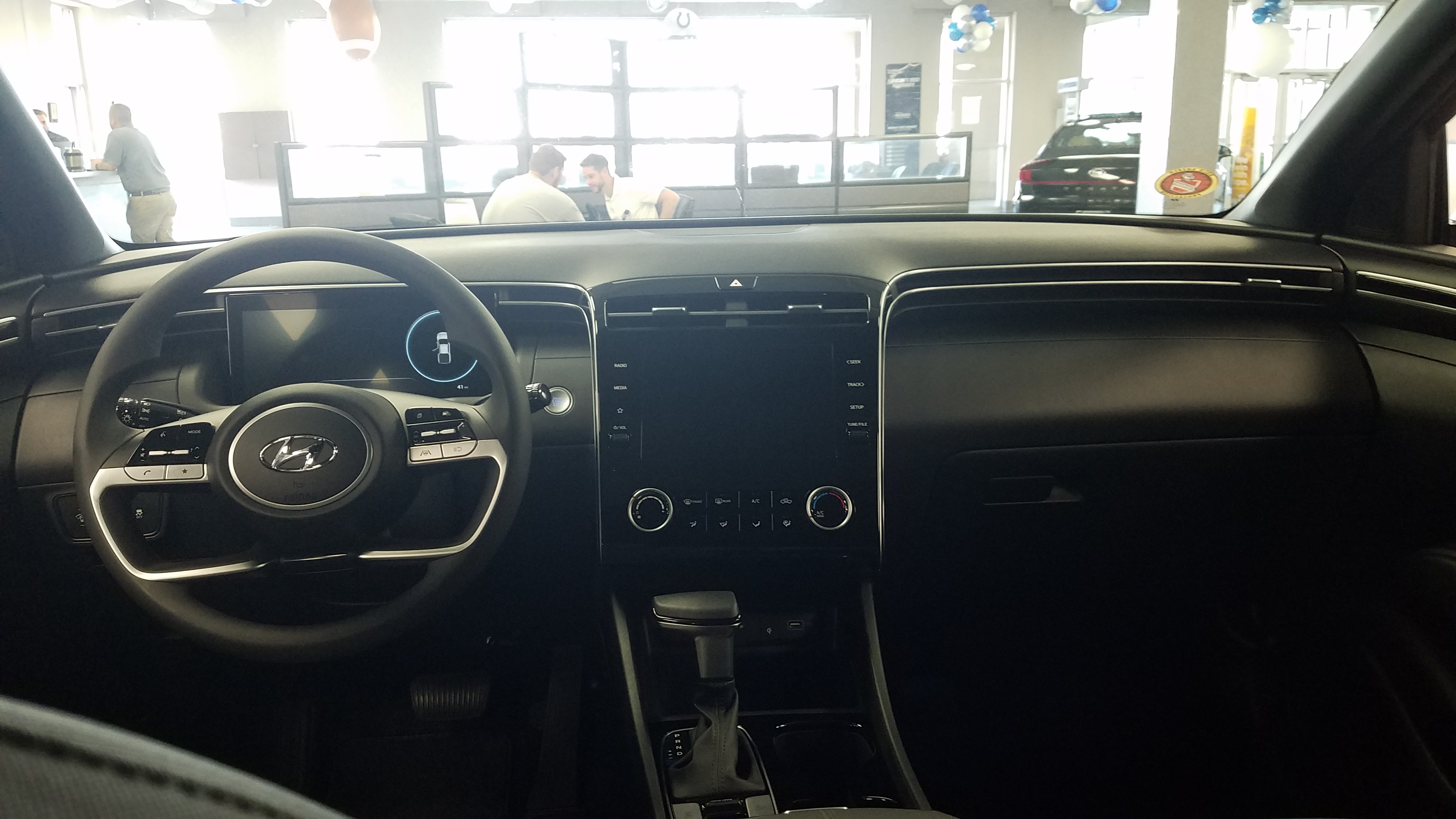
Interior (pre-facelift)

== Facelift (2025) ==
The facelifted Santa Cruz was revealed on March 27, 2024. Changes include new headlights with redesigned LED daytime running lights, a new front fascia, a new grille, new exterior colors, new alloy wheel designs, a new curved panoramic screen with two 12.3-inch displays, the inclusion of physical controls for the HVAC and infotainment shortcuts, a new steering wheel, new air-con vents, updated features for safety and technology, and the XRT version received a few visual changes.

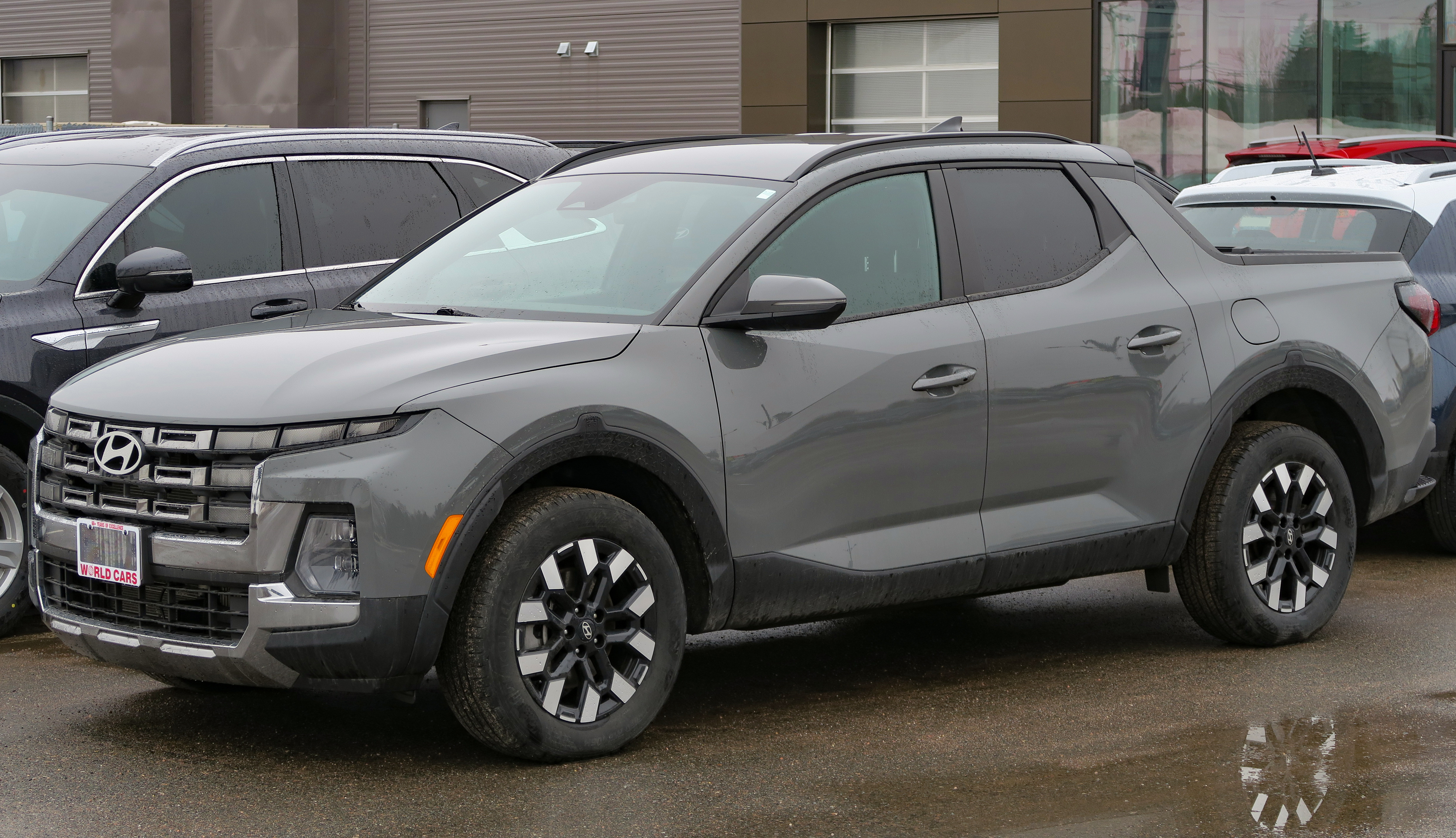
2025 Santa Cruz Preferred (facelift)

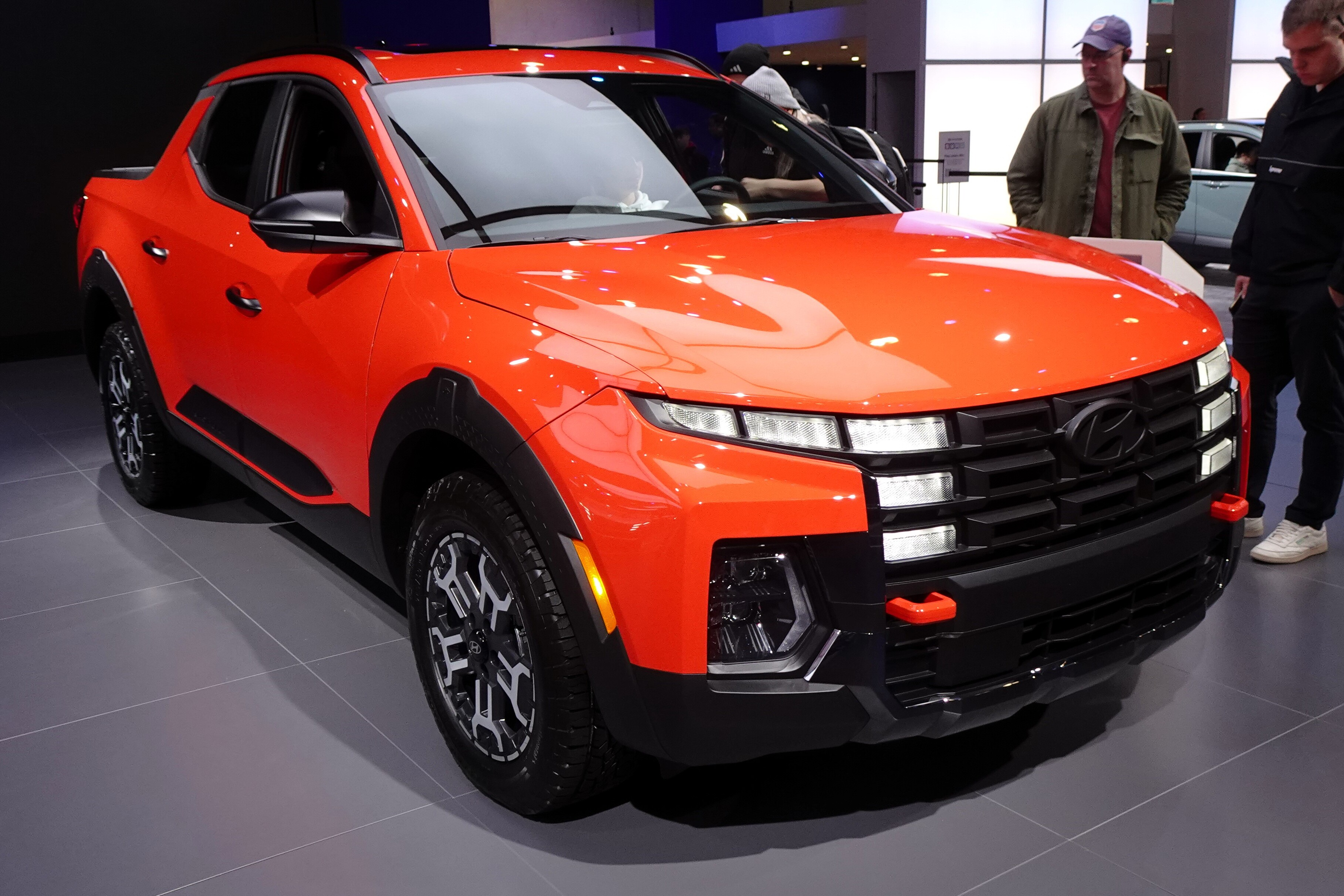
2025 Santa Cruz XRT (facelift)

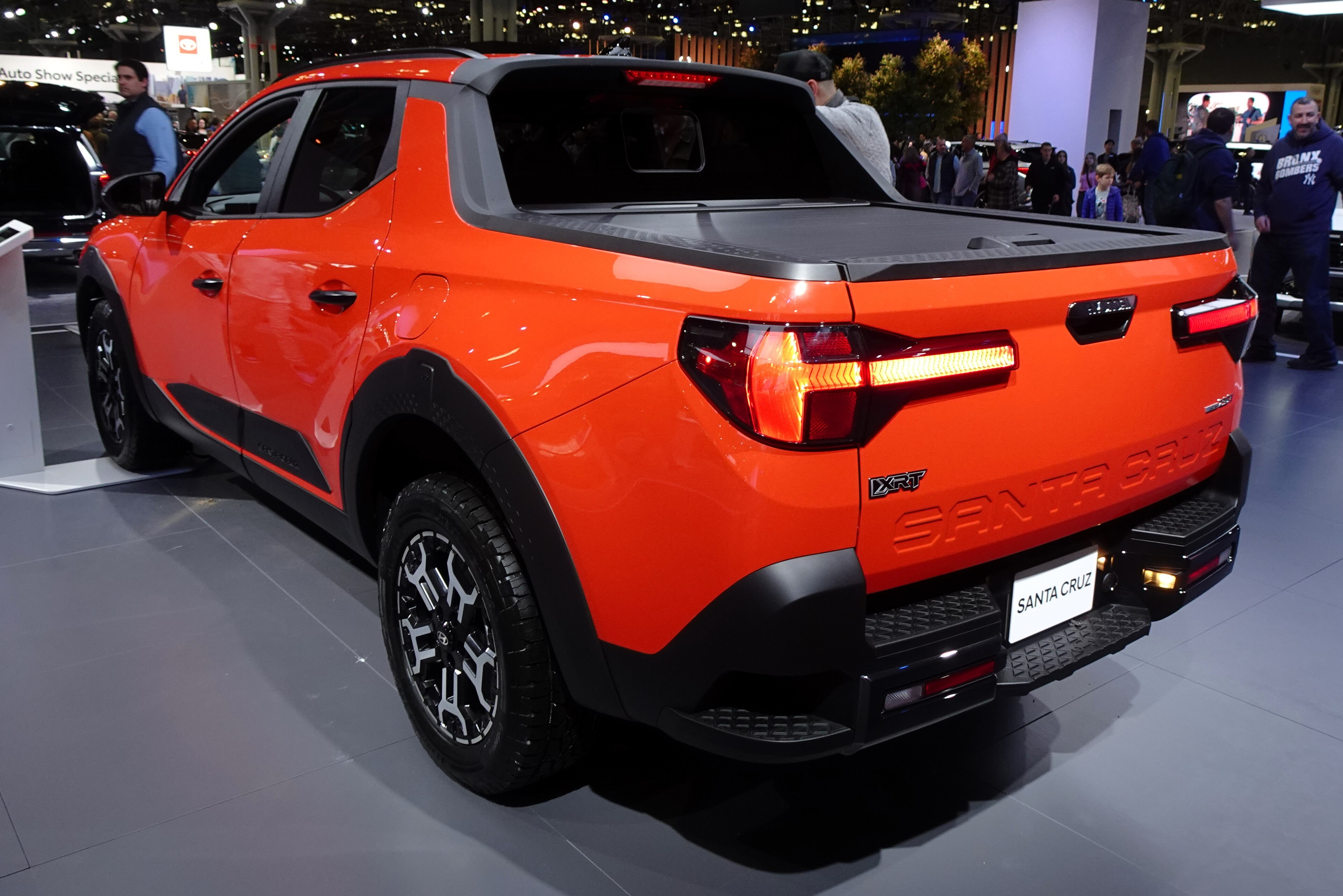
Rear view (XRT; facelift)

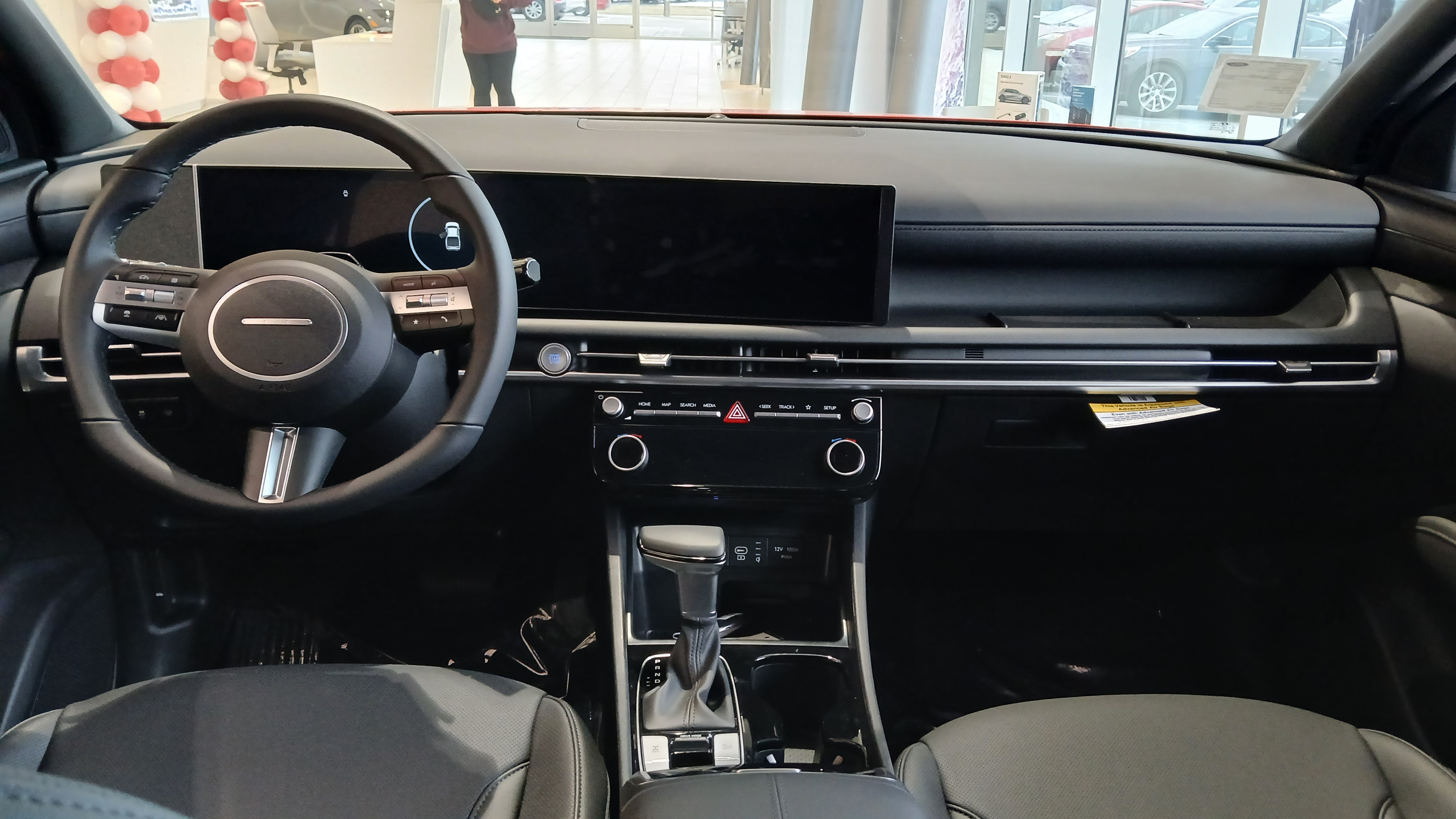
Interior (XRT; facelift)

== Powertrain ==
The Santa Cruz is available with a standard naturally aspirated 2.5-liter 4-cylinder gasoline engine with both port and direct injection that produces 191 hp (194 PS; 142 kW) and 181 lb⋅ft (245 N⋅m; 25.0 kg⋅m) of torque that is exclusive to the United States. A turbocharged 2.5-liter engine that produces 281 hp (285 PS; 210 kW) and 311 lb⋅ft (422 N⋅m; 43.0 kg⋅m) of torque is available as an option, and is standard in Canada while being an option in the United States. The base engine is paired with an 8-speed automatic transmission, while the turbocharged engine is paired with an eight-speed dual-clutch automatic with paddle shifters. For the 2026 model year, the turbocharged engine became paired with an 8-speed automatic transmission, replacing the dual-clutch automatic.

== Safety ==
The 2022 Santa Cruz was awarded "Top Safety Pick" by IIHS.

IIHS scores (2022 model year)
Small overlap front (driver)	Good		
Small overlap front (passenger)	Good		
Moderate overlap front (original test)	Good		
Side (original test)	Good		
Roof strength	Good		
Head restraints and seats	Good		
Headlights (varies by trim/option)	Good	Poor	
Front crash prevention: vehicle-to-vehicle	Superior		Standard system
Front crash prevention: vehicle-to-vehicle	Superior		Optional system
Front crash prevention: vehicle-to-pedestrian (Day)	Superior		Standard system
Front crash prevention: vehicle-to-pedestrian (Day)	Superior		Optional system
Seatbelt reminders	Acceptable		
Child seat anchors (LATCH) ease of use	Acceptable		

== Sales ==
Year	United States	Canada
2021	10,042	930
2022	36,480	3,682
2023	36,675	3,544
2024	32,033	2,574
2025	25,499	1,643
