= List of Hyundai transmissions =

Hyundai Transys is an affiliate company of Hyundai Motor Group and produces a number of automobile transmissions, axles and seats in-house.

On January 1, 2019, Hyundai DYMOS and Hyundai Powertech were merged with Hyundai Transys.

Hyundai Powertech was established in 2001 as South Korea's first automatic transmission specialist. It has plants in South Korea, China, and the United States. Its automatic transmissions are used in Hyundai, Kia, Dodge, and Jeep vehicles.

Hyundai DYMOS produces MT based transmissions including DCT and AMT along with axles, 4WD and seats as automotive parts.

== Automatic Transmission (AT) ==
=== Front wheel ===
==== 4-speed automatic ====
===== A4F12/A4CF0 =====
Rated up to 12.5 kg⋅m (123 N⋅m; 90 lbf⋅ft) while having a dry weight of 58.6 kg (129.2 lb).

1	2	3	4	R	Final drive	Application
2.919	1.551	1.000	0.713	2.480	4.846	Kia Ray
2.919	1.551	1.000	0.713	2.480	4.336	Kia Picanto/Morning (SA); Kia Picanto/Morning (JA)
2.919	1.551	1.000	0.713	2.480	4.104	Kia Picanto/Morning (TA)

===== A4F16/A4CF1 =====
Rated up to 15.5 kg⋅m (152 N⋅m; 112 lbf⋅ft) while having a dry weight of 73.9 kg (162.9 lb).

1	2	3	4	R	Final drive	Application
2.919	1.551	1.000	0.713	2.480	4.375	Hyundai Accent; Kia Rio (UB) 1.4L
2.919	1.551	1.000	0.713	2.480	4.619	Kia Forte (TD) 1.6L

===== A4F23/A4CF2 =====
Rated up to 23.5 kg⋅m (230 N⋅m; 170 lbf⋅ft) while having a dry weight of 74.1 kg (163.4 lb).

1	2	3	4	R	Final drive	Applications
2.919	1.551	1.000	0.713	2.480	4.121	Hyundai i30 (FD) 2.0L

==== 5-speed automatic ====
===== A5F16 =====
Rated up to 15.5 kg⋅m (152 N⋅m; 112 lbf⋅ft) while having a dry weight of 83.5 kg (184.1 lb).

1	2	3	4	5	R
3.939	2.093	1.349	0.962	0.713	3.347

===== A5F23/A5GF1 =====
Rated up to 23.5 kg⋅m (230 N⋅m; 170 lbf⋅ft) while having a dry weight of 87.4 kg (192.7 lb).

1	2	3	4	5	R
3.939	2.093	1.349	0.962	0.713	3.347

===== A5HF1 =====
Rated up to 35 kg⋅m (343 N⋅m; 253 lbf⋅ft)

1	2	3	4	5	R	Final Drive	Application
4.497	2.442	1.686	1.233	0.868	4.586	3.333	Hyundai Santa Fe (CM) 2.2D

==== 6-speed automatic ====
===== A6F17 =====
Rated up to 17 kg⋅m (167 N⋅m; 123 lbf⋅ft) while having a dry weight of 72.7 kg (160.3 lb).

1	2	3	4	5	6	R	Application
4.400	2.726	1.834	1.392	1.000	0.775	3.440	Hyundai Elantra

===== A6F18 =====
Rated up to 18 kg⋅m (177 N⋅m; 130 lbf⋅ft) while having a dry weight of 70.7 kg (155.9 lb).

1	2	3	4	5	6	R
4.400	2.726	1.834	1.392	1.000	0.775	3.440

===== A6F22/A6GF1 =====
Rated up to 22 kg⋅m (216 N⋅m; 159 lbf⋅ft) while having a dry weight of 75.9 kg (167.3 lb).

1	2	3	4	5	6	R	Final drive	Application
4.400	2.726	1.834	1.392	1.000	0.774	3.440	3.270	Hyundai Elantra (HD/MD/AD) 1.6L; Hyundai i30 1.4L/1.6L/1.8L; Hyundai Kona (OS) 2.0L; Hyundai Sonata 2.0L; Hyundai Veloster 1.6L/2.0L; Kia Forte (YD) 1.6L; Kia Optima; Kia Rio; Kia Sportage
4.400	2.726	1.834	1.392	1.000	0.774	3.440	3.796	Kia Soul 1.6L
4.400	2.726	1.834	1.392	1.000	0.775	3.440	3.957	Kia Soul (PS) 1.6L

===== A6F24/A6MF1 =====
Rated up to 23.5 kg⋅m (230 N⋅m; 170 lbf⋅ft) while having a dry weight of 79.9 kg (176.1 lb). It is contracted by Chrysler Group LLC for use in 2013–2016 Dodge Dart and 2014-2016 Jeep Compass and Jeep Patriot, the transmission is designed to be maintenance-free under normal use and is assembled in South Korea.

1	2	3	4	5	6	R	Final drive	Application
4.639	2.826	1.841	1.386	1.000	0.772	3.385		Dodge Dart (PF); Jeep Compass; Jeep Patriot
4.639	2.826	1.841	1.386	1.000	0.772	3.385	2.885	Kia Optima (TF) 2.0L Nu
4.162	2.575	1.772	1.369	1.000	0.778	3.500	3.510	Hyundai Tucson; Kia Sportage (SL) 2.0L
4.162	2.575	1.772	1.369	1.000	0.778	3.500	3.648	Hyundai Tucson 4WD; Kia Sportage (SL) 2.0L 4WD
4.212	2.637	1.800	1.386	1.000	0.772	3.385	3.064	Kia Soul 1.6D
4.212	2.637	1.800	1.386	1.000	0.772	3.385	3.320	Kia Cadenza (VG) 2.4L MPi
4.212	2.637	1.800	1.386	1.000	0.772	3.385	3.367	Kia Optima (TF) 2.0L Theta II
4.212	2.637	1.800	1.386	1.000	0.772	3.385	3.510	Kia Carens (RP) 2.0L LPI
4.440	2.726	1.834	1.392	1.000	0.774	3.440	3.383	Kia Optima (JF) 2.0L
4.440	2.726	1.834	1.392	1.000	0.774	3.440	3.510	Hyundai Tucson (TL) 2.0L 2WD
4.440	2.726	1.834	1.392	1.000	0.774	3.440	3.612	Kia Sportage (QL) 2.0L

===== A6F27/A6MF2 =====
Rated up to 27 kg⋅m (265 N⋅m; 195 lbf⋅ft) while having a dry weight of 80.7 kg (177.9 lb).

1	2	3	4	5	6	R	Final drive	Application
4.639	2.826	1.841	1.386	1.000	0.772	3.385	2.885	Kia Carens (RP) 1.7D
4.639	2.826	1.841	1.386	1.000	0.772	3.385	3.320	Hyundai Tucson; Hyundai Veloster Turbo (FS)
4.639	2.826	1.841	1.386	1.000	0.772	3.385	3.648	Hyundai Santa Fe (DM) 2.4L; Kia Forte (YD) 1.6T; Kia Opirus 2.7 LPi; Kia Sorento (XM) 2.7L LPi
4.212	2.637	1.800	1.386	1.000	0.772	3.385	2.885	Kia Cadenza (VG) 2.4L
4.212	2.637	1.800	1.386	1.000	0.772	3.385	3.195	Kia Cadenza (YG) 2.4L
4.212	2.637	1.800	1.386	1.000	0.772	3.385	3.913	Kia Opirus 2.7L MPi; Kia Sorento 2.4L
4.162	2.575	1.772	1.369	1.000	0.778	3.500		
4.252	2.654	1.804	1.386	1.000	0.772	3.393	3.041	Kia K7 (VG) 2.7L

===== A6F28H/A6FMH/A6MF2H =====
For Hybrid applications, rated up to 28.5 kg⋅m (279 N⋅m; 206 lbf⋅ft) while having a dry weight of 125.5 kg (276.7 lb).

1	2	3	4	5	6	R	Final drive	Application
4.639	2.826	1.841	1.386	1.000	0.772	3.385	3.064	Kia Cadenza Hybrid (VG)
4.639	2.826	1.841	1.386	1.000	0.772	3.385	3.320	Kia K5 Hybrid (TF)
4.639	2.826	1.841	1.386	1.000	0.772	3.385	3.510	Hyundai Sonata Hybrid (DN8); Kia K5 Hybrid (DL3); Hyundai Santa Fe Hybrid (TM); Hyundai Santa Fe Hybrid (MX5)

===== A6F30 =====
Rated up to 30 kg⋅m (294 N⋅m; 217 lbf⋅ft) while having a dry weight of 82.1 kg (181.0 lb).

1	2	3	4	5	6	R
4.639	2.826	1.841	1.386	1.000	0.772	3.385

===== A6F33/A6LF1 =====
Rated up to 33.5 kg⋅m (329 N⋅m; 242 lbf⋅ft) while having a dry weight of 91 kg (200.6 lb).

1	2	3	4	5	6	R	Final drive	Application
4.252	2.654	1.804	1.386	1.000	0.772	3.393	3.041	Hyundai Azera 3.3L; Kia Cadenza (VG) 3.0L; Kia Opirus 3.3L
4.252	2.654	1.804	1.386	1.000	0.772	3.393	2.885	Kia Cadenza (YG) 3.0L LPi
4.651	2.831	1.842	1.386	1.000	0.772	3.385		

===== A6F36/A6LF2 =====
Rated up to 36.5 kg⋅m (358 N⋅m; 264 lbf⋅ft) while having a dry weight of 93.5 kg (206.1 lb).

1	2	3	4	5	6	R	Final drive	Application
4.162	2.575	1.772	1.369	1.000	0.778	3.386	3.648	Kia Sportage (SL/QL) 2.0T
4.252	2.654	1.804	1.386	1.000	0.772	3.393	3.041	Hyundai Grandeur/Azera (HG) 3.0L/3.3L; Kia Cadenza (VG) 3.3L/3.5L; Kia Carnival (VQ) 3.5L; Kia Carnival (YP) 3.3L; Kia Opirus 3.8L; Kia Sportage 2.0D
4.651	2.831	1.842	1.386	1.000	0.772	3.385	3.195	Hyundai Tucson (LM/TL) 2.0D; Kia Sorento 2.0D
4.651	2.831	1.842	1.386	1.000	0.772	3.385	3.510	Hyundai Aslan; Hyundai Azera 3.8L; Hyundai Santa Fe 2.0T/3.3L; Hyundai Sonata (YF/LF) 2.0T
4.651	2.831	1.842	1.386	1.000	0.772	3.393	2.885	Kia Optima (TF) 2.0T
4.766	2.946	1.917	1.420	1.000	0.772	3.393	2.885	Kia Optima (JF) 2.0T

===== A6LF3 =====
Rated up to 42 kg⋅m (412 N⋅m; 304 lbf⋅ft).

1	2	3	4	5	6	R	Final drive	Application
4.651	2.831	1.842	1.386	1.000	0.772	3.393	3.195	Kia Carnival (VQ) 2.2D; Kia Sorento 2.2D
4.651	2.831	1.842	1.386	1.000	0.772	3.393	3.320	Kia Carnival (YP) 2.2D

==== 8-speed automatic ====
===== A8F27/A8MF1 =====
Rated up to 27 kg⋅m (265 N⋅m; 195 lbf⋅ft) while having a dry weight of 82.3 kg (181.4 lb).

1	2	3	4	5	6	7	8	R	Final drive	Application
4.717	2.906	1.864	1.423	1.224	1.000	0.790	0.635	3.239	3.648	Hyundai Santa Cruz
4.717	2.906	1.864	1.423	1.224	1.000	0.790	0.635	3.239	3.195	Hyundai Santa Fe (TM) 2.5L; Hyundai Sonata (DN8) 1.6T/2.5L; Kia Cadenza (YG) 2.5L; Kia K5 (DL3) 2.5L

===== A8F36/A8LF1 =====
Rated up to 36.5 kg⋅m (358 N⋅m; 264 lbf⋅ft) while having a dry weight of 95.1 kg (209.7 lb).

1	2	3	4	5	6	7	8	R	Final drive	Application
4.808	2.901	1.864	1.424	1.219	1.000	0.799	0.648	3.425	3.510	Hyundai Aslan; Hyundai Azera 3.0L/3.3L/3.5L; Hyundai Palisade 3.5L/3.8L; Hyundai Santa Fe 2.0T/3.5L; Hyundai Sonata 2.0T; Kia Carnival (YP) 3.3L; Kia Sportage (QL) 2.0T; Kia Telluride
4.808	2.901	1.864	1.424	1.219	1.000	0.799	0.648	3.425	3.320	Kia Cadenza (YG) 3.0L/3.3L/3.5L; Kia Sportage (QL) 2.0D
4.808	2.901	1.864	1.424	1.219	1.000	0.799	0.648	3.425	3.195	Kia Sorento (UM) 2.0T

===== A8F42/A8LF2 =====
Rated up to 42 kg⋅m (412 N⋅m; 304 lbf⋅ft) while having a dry weight of 98 kg (216.1 lb).

1	2	3	4	5	6	7	8	R	Final drive	Application
4.808	2.901	1.864	1.424	1.219	1.000	0.799	0.648	3.425	3.195	Kia Cadenza (YG) 2.2D; Kia Sorento 2.2D
4.808	2.901	1.864	1.424	1.219	1.000	0.799	0.648	3.425	3.510	Hyundai Grandeur 2.2D; Hyundai Palisade 2.2D; Hyundai Santa Fe 2.2D; Hyundai Tucson 2.0D; Kia Sportage (NQ5) 2.0D; Kia Carnival 2.2D

===== A8FLH =====
For Hybrid applications, rated up to 25.5 kg⋅m (250 N⋅m; 184 lbf⋅ft) (motor only) or 52 kg⋅m (510 N⋅m; 376 lbf⋅ft) total output.

=== Rear wheel ===
==== 5-speed automatic ====
===== A5R25 =====
Rated up to 25 kg⋅m (245 N⋅m; 181 lbf⋅ft) while having a dry weight of 91 kg (200.6 lb).

1	2	3	4	5	R
3.827	2.368	1.520	1.000	0.834	2.613

===== A5R35/A5SR1 =====
Rated up to 35 kg⋅m (343 N⋅m; 253 lbf⋅ft) while having a dry weight of 93 kg (205 lb).

1	2	3	4	5	R	Final drive	Application
3.827	2.368	1.520	1.000	0.834	2.613		Hyundai Porter; Kia Bongo
3.827	2.368	1.520	1.000	0.834	2.613	3.909	Hyundai Genesis Coupe 2.0T
3.827	2.368	1.520	1.000	0.834	2.613	3.333	Kia Sorento (BL) 3.5L

===== A5R45/A5SR2 =====
Rated up to 45 kg⋅m (441 N⋅m; 325 lbf⋅ft) while having a dry weight of 98 kg (216.1 lb).

1	2	3	4	5	R	Final drive	Application
3.827	2.368	1.519	1.000	0.834	2.613	3.333	Kia Mohave
3.827	2.368	1.520	1.000	0.834	2.613	3.333	Kia Sorento (BL) 2.5D
3.731	2.308	1.520	1.000	0.841	2.740		Hyundai Starex

==== 8-speed automatic ====
===== A8R40/A8LR1 =====
Rated up to 40 kg⋅m (392 N⋅m; 289 lbf⋅ft) while having a dry weight of 72.8 kg (160.5 lb).

Gear ratios
1	2	3	4	5	6	7	8	R	Final drive	Application
3.964	2.468	1.610	1.176	1.000	0.832	0.652	0.565	2.273	4.181	Hyundai Genesis Coupe
3.964	2.468	1.610	1.176	1.000	0.832	0.652	0.565	2.273	4.36	Genesis GV80 2.5T
3.964	2.468	1.610	1.176	1.000	0.832	0.652	0.565	2.273	3.538	Kia Stinger 2.5T
3.964	2.468	1.610	1.176	1.000	0.832	0.652	0.565	2.273	3.385	Genesis G70 2.2D; Kia Stinger 2.2D
3.665	2.396	1.190	0.826	1.000	0.643	0.556	0.565	2.273	3.909	Genesis G80 2.2D/2.5T/3.3L/3.8L; Genesis G90 3.8L; Hyundai Equus (VI) 3.8L; Hyundai Genesis 3.3L/3.8L; Kia K9 3.3L/3.8L
3.665	2.396	1.190	0.826	1.000	0.643	0.556	0.565	2.273	3.727	Genesis G70 2.0T; Kia Stinger 2.0T

===== A8R50/A8TR1 =====
Rated up to 53 kg⋅m (520 N⋅m; 383 lbf⋅ft) while having a dry weight of 80.3 kg (177.0 lb).

Gear ratios
1	2	3	4	5	6	7	8	R	Final drive	Application
3.665	2.396	1.610	1.190	1.000	0.826	0.643	0.556	2.273	3.538	Genesis G70 3.3T; Genesis G80 (DH) 3.3T/5.0L; Genesis G90 3.3T/4.6L/5.0L; Hyundai Equus (VI) 4.6L/5.0L; Hyundai Genesis 4.6L/5.0L; Kia K9 5.0L; Kia Stinger 3.3T
3.665	2.396	1.610	1.190	1.000	0.826	0.643	0.556	2.273	3.727	Genesis G80 3.5T
3.964	2.468	1.610	1.176	1.000	0.832	0.652	0.565	2.273	3.909	Genesis GV80 3.5T
3.795	2.473	1.613	1.177	1.000	0.831	0.652	0.571	2.467	3.909	Kia Mohave 3.0D

== Continuously Variable Transmission (CVT) ==
=== Kappa CVT ===
Rated up to 12.5 kg⋅m (123 N⋅m; 90 lbf⋅ft) or 14 kg⋅m (137 N⋅m; 101 lbf⋅ft), supports idle stop and go functions.

Highest	Lowest	R	Final drive	Application
4.335	0.545	3.637	3.565	Kia Morning (TA) 1.0T; Kia Ray 1.0T
4.335	0.545	3.637	3.905	Kia Morning (TA) 1.0L

=== Gamma CVT CF18/C0GF1 ===
Rated up to 18.3 kg⋅m (179 N⋅m; 132 lbf⋅ft), supports idle stop and go functions.

Highest	Lowest	R	Final drive	Application
2.550	0.385	1.053	3.565	Kia Forte (BD) 1.6L

=== CF28 ===
Rated up to 28 kg⋅m (275 N⋅m; 203 lbf⋅ft).

== Dual Clutch Transmission (DCT) ==
=== 6-speed dual clutch ===
==== D6GF1 ====
Rated up to 22 kg⋅m (216 N⋅m; 159 lbf⋅ft) while having a dry weight of 70.8 kg (156.1 lb). This transmission uses dry clutch.

1	2	3	4	5	6	R	Final drive	Application
3.615	1.955	1.303	0.943	0.939	0.743	4.531	4.813 (1–4); 3.667 (5–6)	Hyundai Veloster (FS) 1.6L

==== D6KF1/D6F27H ====
For Hybrid applications, rated up to 27 kg⋅m (265 N⋅m; 195 lbf⋅ft) while having a dry weight of 106.1 kg (233.9 lb). This transmission uses dry clutch.

1	2	3	4	5	6	R	Final drive	Application
3.867	2.217	1.371	0.93	0.956	0.767	5.351	4.438 (1–4); 3.227 (5–6, R)	Hyundai Ioniq; Kia Niro; Hyundai Kona

=== 7-speed dual clutch ===
==== D7GF1/D7F22 ====
Rated up to 22 kg⋅m (216 N⋅m; 159 lbf⋅ft) while having a dry weight of 70.8 kg (156.1 lb). This transmission uses dry clutch.

1	2	3	4	5	6	7	R	Application
3.813	2.261	1.957	1.073	0.902	0.837	0.756	5.101	Hyundai Elantra; Hyundai Sonata; Hyundai Tucson; Kia Optima

==== D7UF1/D7F34 ====
Rated up to 34 kg⋅m (333 N⋅m; 246 lbf⋅ft) while having a dry weight of 79.8 kg (175.9 lb). This transmission uses dry clutch.

1	2	3	4	5	6	7	R	Final drive	Application
3.929	2.314	2.043	1.070	0.822	0.884	0.721	5.304		Hyundai Accent; Kia Pride
3.929	2.318	2.043	1.070	0.822	0.884	0.721	5.304	4.294 (1–2, 4–5); 3.174 (3, 6–7, R)	Hyundai Kona (OS); Kia Optima (JF) 1.6T
3.929	2.318	2.043	1.070	0.822	0.884	0.721	5.304	4.857 (1–2, 4–5); 3.579 (3, 6–7, R)	Hyundai Tucson (TL) 1.6T
3.929	2.318	1.957	1.023	0.778	0.837	0.681	5.304	4.929 (1–2, 4–5); 3.632 (3, 6–7, R)	Hyundai Tucson (NX4) 1.6T/1.6D
3.643	2.174	1.826	1.024	0.809	0.854	0.717	4.696	4.643 (1–2, 4–5); 3.611 (3, 6–7, R)	Hyundai Elantra; Hyundai Kona (OS) 4WD; Hyundai Veloster Turbo
3.786	2.261	1.957	1.023	0.778	0.837	0.681	5.074	4.176 (1–2, 4–5); 3.087 (3, 6–7, R)	Kia Sportage (QL) 1.6D
3.786	2.261	1.957	1.023	0.778	0.837	0.681	5.074	4.286 (1–2, 4–5); 3.158 (3, 6–7, R)	Kia Forte (YD) 1.6T; Kia K5 (JF) 1.7D
3.786	2.261	1.957	1.023	0.778	0.837	0.681	5.074	4.429 (1–2, 4–5); 3.263 (3, 6–7, R)	Kia Stonic 1.6D
3.786	2.261	1.957	1.023	0.778	0.837	0.681	5.074	4.643 (1–2, 4–5); 3.421 (3, 6–7, R)	Kia Sportage (QL) 1.7D

=== 8-speed dual clutch ===
==== D8LF1/D8F48W ====
Rated up to 48 kg⋅m (471 N⋅m; 347 lbf⋅ft). This transmission uses wet clutch.

1	2	3	4	5	6	7	8	R	Final drive	Application
3.714	2.261	1.552	1.158	0.927	0.767	0.627	0.498	3.697	3.800 (1–2, 5–6, R); 2.714 (3–4, 7–8)	Hyundai Elantra N Hyundai Veloster N
3.643	2.304	1.601	1.321	0.884	0.703	0.571	0.477	3.697	4.077 (1–2, 5–6, R); 2.944 (3–4, 7–8)	Hyundai Sonata N-Line; Kia K5 GT
3.429	2.217	1.517	1.109	0.860	0.673	0.541	0.447	3.967	4.846 (1–2, 5–6, R); 3.316 (3–4, 7–8)	Hyundai Santa Cruz; Hyundai Santa Fe; Kia Sorento

== Automated Manual Transmission (AMT) ==
=== 5-Speed AMT ===
==== S5F13 ====
Rated up to 13 kg⋅m (127 N⋅m; 94 lbf⋅ft).

== Manual Transmission (MT) ==
=== Front Wheel ===
==== 5-speed manual ====
===== M5EF2/M5F13 =====
Rated up to 13.5 kg⋅m (132 N⋅m; 98 lbf⋅ft) while having a dry weight of 30.1 kg (66.4 lb)

1	2	3	4	5	R	Final drive	Applications
3.545	1.895	1.192	0.906	0.719	3.636	4.600	Kia Picanto (TA)
3.545	1.894	1.192	0.853	0.719	3.636	4.800	Kia Picanto (SA)

===== M5AF3/M5F14 =====
Rated up to 14.6 kg⋅m (143 N⋅m; 106 lbf⋅ft) while having a dry weight of 35.6 kg (78.5 lb)

1	2	3	4	5	R
3.615	1.950	1.286	1.031	0.825	3.250

===== M5CF1/M5F16 =====
Rated up to 17.5 kg⋅m (172 N⋅m; 127 lbf⋅ft) while having a dry weight of 34.9 kg (76.9 lb)

1	2	3	4	5	R	Final drive	Applications
3.615	1.962	1.286	0.971	0.839	3.545		
3.615	2.053	1.370	1.031	0.837	3.583	4.056	Kia Rio (JB) 1.6L

===== M5BF2/M5CF2/M5F19 =====
Rated up to 19 kg⋅m (186 N⋅m; 137 lbf⋅ft) while having a dry weight of 38 kg (83.8 lb)

1	2	3	4	5	R	Final Drive	Application
3.615	1.950	1.370	1.031	0.780	3.583	4.294	Kia Forte (TD) 1.6L
3.615	1.962	1.257	0.905	0.702	3.583	3.471	Kia Rio (JB) 1.5D
3.615	1.962	1.257	0.905	0.702	3.583	3.941	Kia Forte (TD) 1.5D
3.615	2.048	1.393	1.061	0.837	3.250		
3.615	2.053	1.370	1.031	0.837	3.583	4.056	Kia Rio (JB) 1.4L
3.462	2.053	1.393	1.061	0.837	3.250	4.056	Hyundai Coupe/Tiburon (GK) 2.0L
3.462	2.053	1.393	1.061	0.837	3.250	4.412	Hyundai Coupe/Tiburon (GK) 1.6L
3.308	1.962	1.257	0.976	0.778	3.583	4.188	Hyundai i30 (FD) 2.0L

===== M5GF1/M5F25 =====
Rated up to 25 kg⋅m (245 N⋅m; 181 lbf⋅ft) while having a dry weight of 49.4 kg (108.9 lb)

1	2	3	4	5	R	Final Drive	Application
3.636	2.056	1.333	0.971	0.775	3.455	4.333	Kia Lotze (MG) 1.8L
3.636	2.080	1.296	0.943	0.778	3.455		
3.231	1.952	1.296	0.943	0.775	3.455	4.063	Hyundai Coupe/Tiburon 2.7L

===== M5GF2 =====
Rated up to 27 kg⋅m (265 N⋅m; 195 lbf⋅ft)

1	2	3	4	5	R	Final Drive	Application
3.273	1.794	1.552	1.176	0.974	3.416	4.333	Hyundai Santa Fe (CM) 2.7L

===== M5HF2 =====
Rated up to 35 kg⋅m (343 N⋅m; 253 lbf⋅ft)

1	2	3	4	5	R	Final Drive	Application
3.875	2.130	1.205	0.848	0.827	4.413	4.500; 3.706	Hyundai Santa Fe (CM) 2.2D

==== 6-speed manual ====
===== M6CF1/M6F17 =====
Rated up to 17.5 kg⋅m (172 N⋅m; 127 lbf⋅ft) while having a dry weight of 35.9 kg (79.1 lb)

1	2	3	4	5	6	R	Final drive	Applications
3.615	1.955	1.370	1.036	0.839	0.703	3.700	4.400	Kia Forte (BD) 1.6L
3.615	1.955	1.370	1.036	0.839	0.727	3.700	4.563	Kia Soul (PS) 1.6L
3.615	1.955	1.370	1.036	0.839	0.727	3.700	4.267	Hyundai Veloster (FS) 1.6L; Kia Soul 1.6L
3.615	1.955	1.370	1.036	0.794	0.688	3.700	4.267	Kia Forte (YD) 1.6L
3.769	2.045	1.370	1.036	0.794	0.688	3.700		?
3.769	2.045	1.370	1.036	0.893	0.774	3.700	4.059	Kia Rio (UB) 1.4L
3.769	2.045	1.286	1.036	0.893	0.774	3.700	3.833	Kia Rio (UB) 1.6L

===== M6CF3/M6F28-1 =====
Rated up to 28 kg⋅m (275 N⋅m; 203 lbf⋅ft) while having a dry weight of 43 kg (94.8 lb)

1	2	3	4	5	6	R	Final drive	Application
3.308	1.962	1.294	0.976	0.778	0.633	3.583	4.467	Hyundai Veloster 2.0/1.6T
3.308	1.962	1.257	0.976	0.778	0.674	3.583		
3.615	1.962	1.294	0.976	0.778	0.633	3.583	4.467	Kia Forte (YD) 1.6T
3.615	1.962	1.257	0.951	0.778	0.674	3.583	3.941	Hyundai Tucson (NX4) 1.6T
3.615	1.962	1.189	0.844	0.702	0.596	3.583	3.941	Kia Soul 1.6D
3.615	1.962	1.189	0.844	0.702	0.596	3.583	4.188	Kia Soul (PS) 1.6D
3.636	1.962	1.257	0.905	0.702	0.596	3.583	3.706	Kia Rio (UB) 1.4D
3.769	2.040	1.294	1.024	0.860	0.756	3.583	4.188	Kia Carens (RP) 2.0L LPI

===== M6CF4/M6F28-2 =====
Rated up to 28 kg⋅m (275 N⋅m; 203 lbf⋅ft) while having a dry weight of 45.5 kg (100.3 lb)

1	2	3	4	5	6	R	Final drive	Applications
3.615	2.080	1.323	1.027	0.884	0.744	3.000		
3.615	2.080	1.386	1.027	0.825	0.702	3.000	4.231 (1–6); 5.000 (R)	Kia K5 2.0L Nu

===== M6GF2 =====
1	2	3	4	5	6	R	Final drive	Applications
3.083	1.931	1.696	1.276	1.027	0.854	3.588	4.154 (1–2, R); 3.176 (3–6)	Hyundai Veloster N standard package
3.083	1.931	1.696	1.276	1.027	0.854	3.588	4.333 (1–2, R); 3.250 (3–6)	Hyundai Veloster N performance package
								Hyundai Tucson diesel
								Kia Sportage diesel

===== M6LF1/M6F44 =====
Rated up to 44 kg⋅m (431 N⋅m; 318 lbf⋅ft) while having a dry weight of 63.5 kg (140.0 lb)

1	2	3	4	5	6	R	Final drive	Applications
3.538	1.909	1.179	0.814	0.737	0.628	3.910		
3.769	2.050	1.296	0.902	0.838	0.707	4.118	4.538 (1–4); 3.933 (5–6, R)	Kia Carnival (VQ) 2.2D

=== Rear Wheel ===
==== 5-speed manual ====
===== M5R18 =====
Rated up to 18 kg⋅m (177 N⋅m; 130 lbf⋅ft) while having a dry weight of 40 kg (88.2 lb)

1	2	3	4	5	R
4.117	2.272	1.425	1.000	0.871	3.958

===== M5R23 =====
Rated up to 23 kg⋅m (226 N⋅m; 166 lbf⋅ft) while having a dry weight of 42.3 kg (93.3 lb)

1	2	3	4	5	R
4.271	2.282	1.414	1.000	0.813	3.814

===== M5R26 =====
Rated up to 25.5 kg⋅m (250 N⋅m; 184 lbf⋅ft) while having a dry weight of 46 kg (101.4 lb)

1	2	3	4	5	R
4.271	2.282	1.414	1.000	0.813	3.814

===== M5R32 =====
Rated up to 32 kg⋅m (314 N⋅m; 231 lbf⋅ft) while having a dry weight of 48 kg (105.8 lb)

1	2	3	4	5	R
4.155	2.265	1.428	1.000	0.880	3.827

===== M5R36 =====
Rated up to 35.7 kg⋅m (350 N⋅m; 258 lbf⋅ft) while having a dry weight of 50 kg (110.2 lb)

1	2	3	4	5	R
4.315	2.475	1.536	1.000	0.807	3.591

==== 6-speed manual ====
===== M6R26 =====
Rated up to 26 kg⋅m (255 N⋅m; 188 lbf⋅ft) while having a dry weight of 43.2 kg (95.2 lb)

1	2	3	4	5	6	R
4.271	2.248	1.364	1.000	0.823	0.676	3.814

===== M6R34 =====
Rated up to 33.7 kg⋅m (330 N⋅m; 244 lbf⋅ft) while having a dry weight of 52 kg (114.6 lb)

1	2	3	4	5	6	R
4.489	2.337	1.350	1.000	0.784	0.679	4.253

===== M6R37 =====
Rated up to 36 kg⋅m (353 N⋅m; 260 lbf⋅ft) while having a dry weight of 51.5–52.6 kg (113.5–116.0 lb)

1	2	3	4	5	6	R
4.489	2.337	1.350	1.000	0.784	0.679	4.253

===== M6R40/M6VR2 =====
Rated up to 40 kg⋅m (392 N⋅m; 289 lbf⋅ft).

1	2	3	4	5	6	R	Final drive	Applications
3.848	2.317	1.623	1.233	1.000	0.794	3.985	3.538	Hyundai Genesis Coupe 3.8L; Genesis G70
3.848	2.317	1.623	1.233	1.000	0.794	3.985	3.727	Hyundai Genesis Coupe 2.0L
4.489	2.337	1.350	1.000	0.784	0.679	4.253		Hyundai Starex (TQ) 2.5L

== Reduction Gear ==
=== Shift by Cable (SBC) ===
==== G1F24 ====
Rated up to 23.4 kg⋅m (229 N⋅m; 169 lbf⋅ft) while having a dry weight of 30 kg (66.1 lb), its used in the Kia Ray EV

==== G1F30 ====
Rated up to 29.1 kg⋅m (285 N⋅m; 210 lbf⋅ft) while having a wet weight of 31 kg (68.3 lb), its used in the Hyundai Avante EV, Kia KX3 EV and Kia Soul EV.

==== G1F36 ====
Rated up to 35.7 kg⋅m (350 N⋅m; 258 lbf⋅ft) while having a wet weight of 32 kg (70.5 lb), its used in the Tucson Fuel Cell EV.

=== Shift by Wire (SBW) ===
==== G1F24 ====
Rated up to 23.4 kg⋅m (229 N⋅m; 169 lbf⋅ft) while having a wet weight of 34 kg (75.0 lb), its used in the Hyundai Ioniq EV.

==== G1F26 ====
Rated up to 26 kg⋅m (255 N⋅m; 188 lbf⋅ft) while having a wet weight of 40 kg (88.2 lb), its used in the Hyundai Nexo, Hyundai Kona EV (OS), Kia Niro EV and Kia Soul EV.

==== G1F32 ====
Rated up to 31.6 kg⋅m (310 N⋅m; 229 lbf⋅ft) while having a wet weight of 30.6 kg (67.5 lb).
