= Kia Telluride =

Mid-size crossover SUV

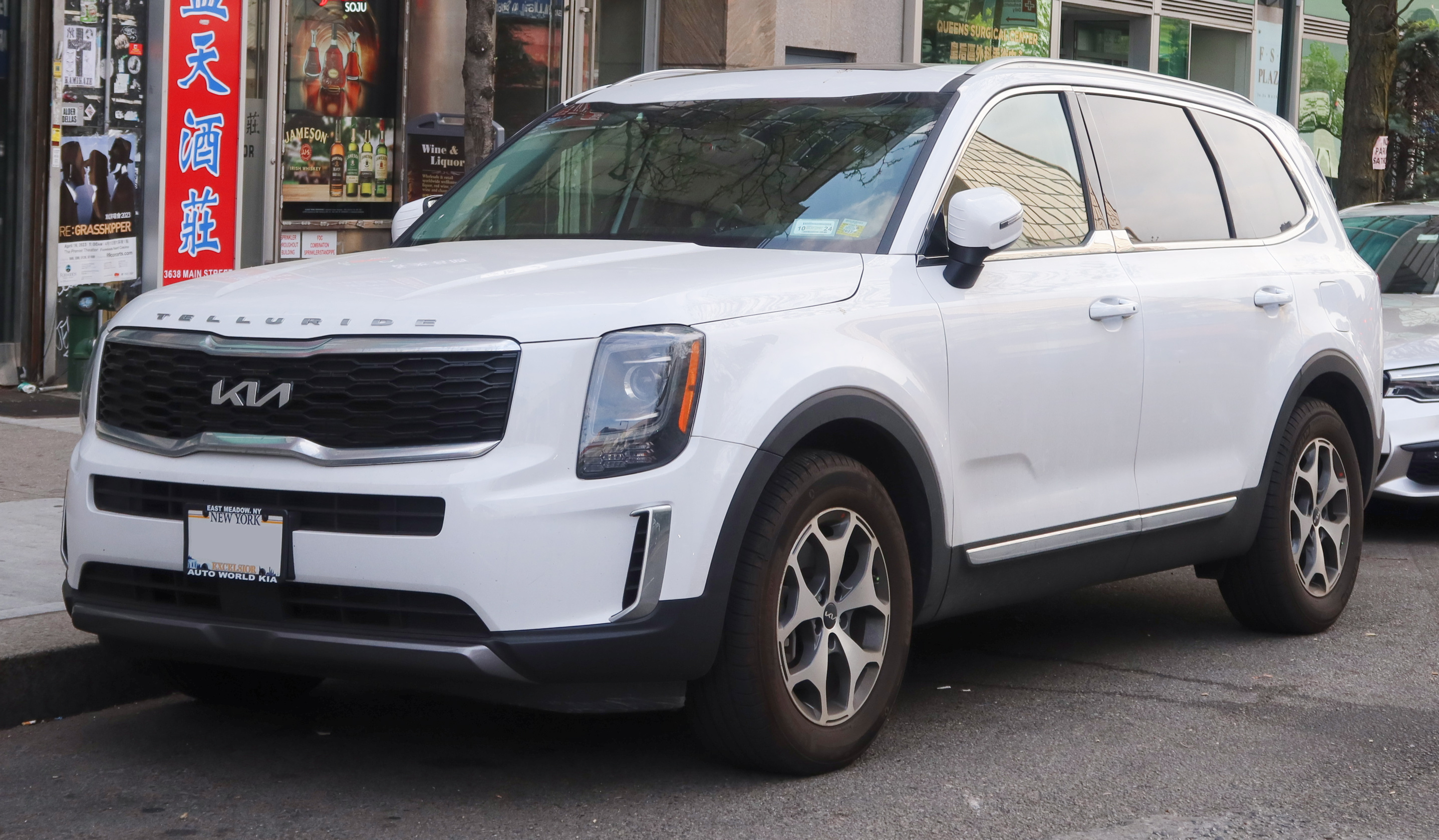
- 2022 Kia Telluride EX (US)

Overview
- Manufacturer: Kia
- Production: February 2019 – present
- Model years: 2020–present

Body and chassis
- Class: Mid-size crossover SUV (E)
- Body style: 5-door SUV
- Layout: Front-engine, front-wheel-drive or all-wheel-drive
- Chassis: Unibody
- Related: Hyundai Palisade

Chronology
- Predecessor: Kia Mohave/Borrego (North America)

The Kia Telluride is a mid-size crossover SUV with three-row seating manufactured and marketed by Kia since 2019.

Positioned above the Sorento, it was previewed as a concept car in 2016, with the production model debuting in early 2019 as a 2020 model.

It shares components and specifications with its Hyundai counterpart, the Hyundai Palisade, including its engine, transmission, and wheelbase.

Named after the town of Telluride, Colorado, the Telluride is the largest vehicle Kia has manufactured in the United States.

== Concept version (2016) ==
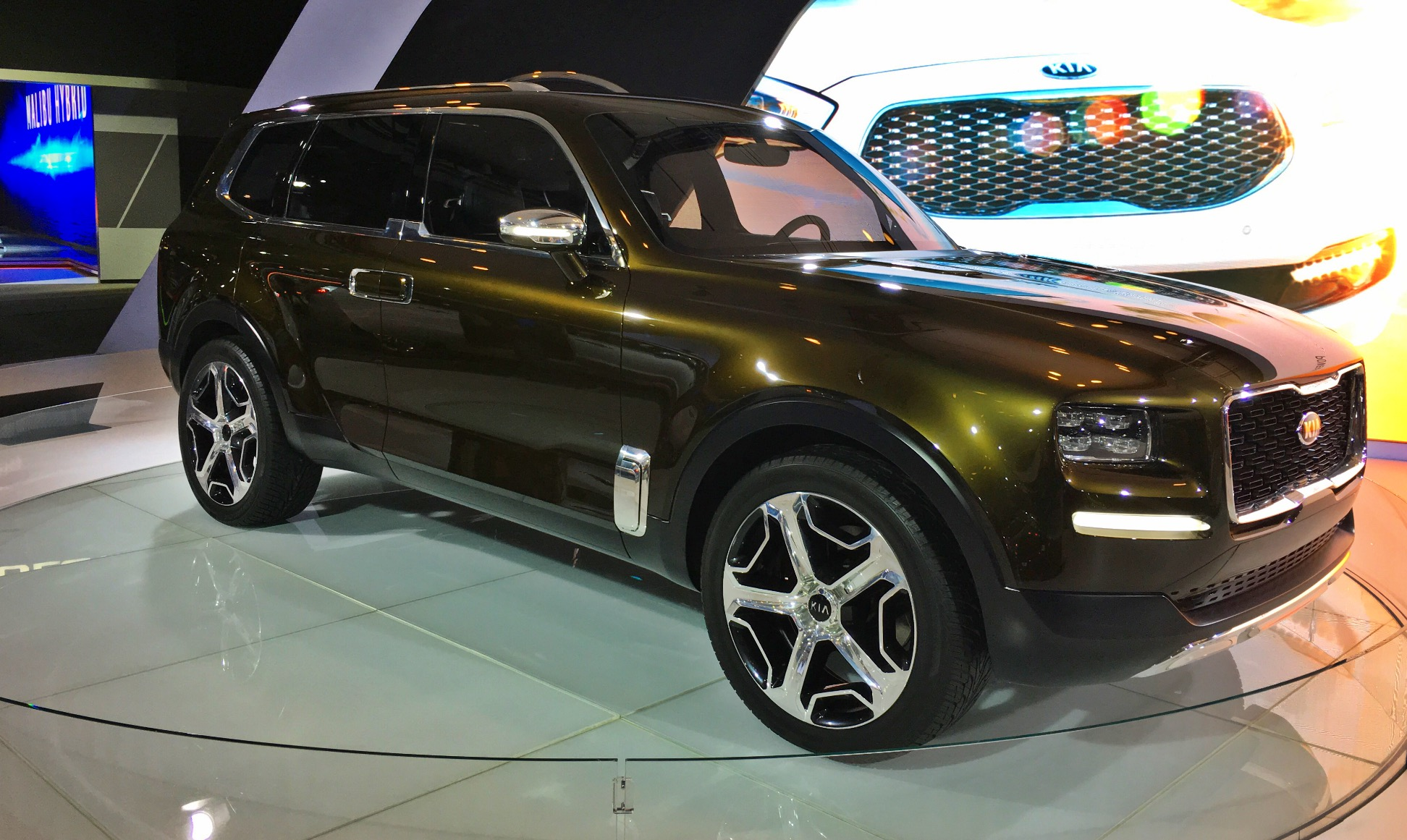
Kia Telluride Concept

The concept version was first introduced at the 2016 North American International Auto Show. A mid-size crossover SUV featuring three-row seating, the Telluride concept is based on a modified Sorento chassis, and powered by a transversely-mounted 3.5-liter gasoline direct injected V6 producing 270 hp (201 kW) combined with an electric motor producing 130 hp (97 kW), for an overall output of 400 hp (298 kW). Fuel consumption is claimed to be 30 miles per US gallon (7.8 L/100 km).

== First generation (ON; 2020) ==
First generation
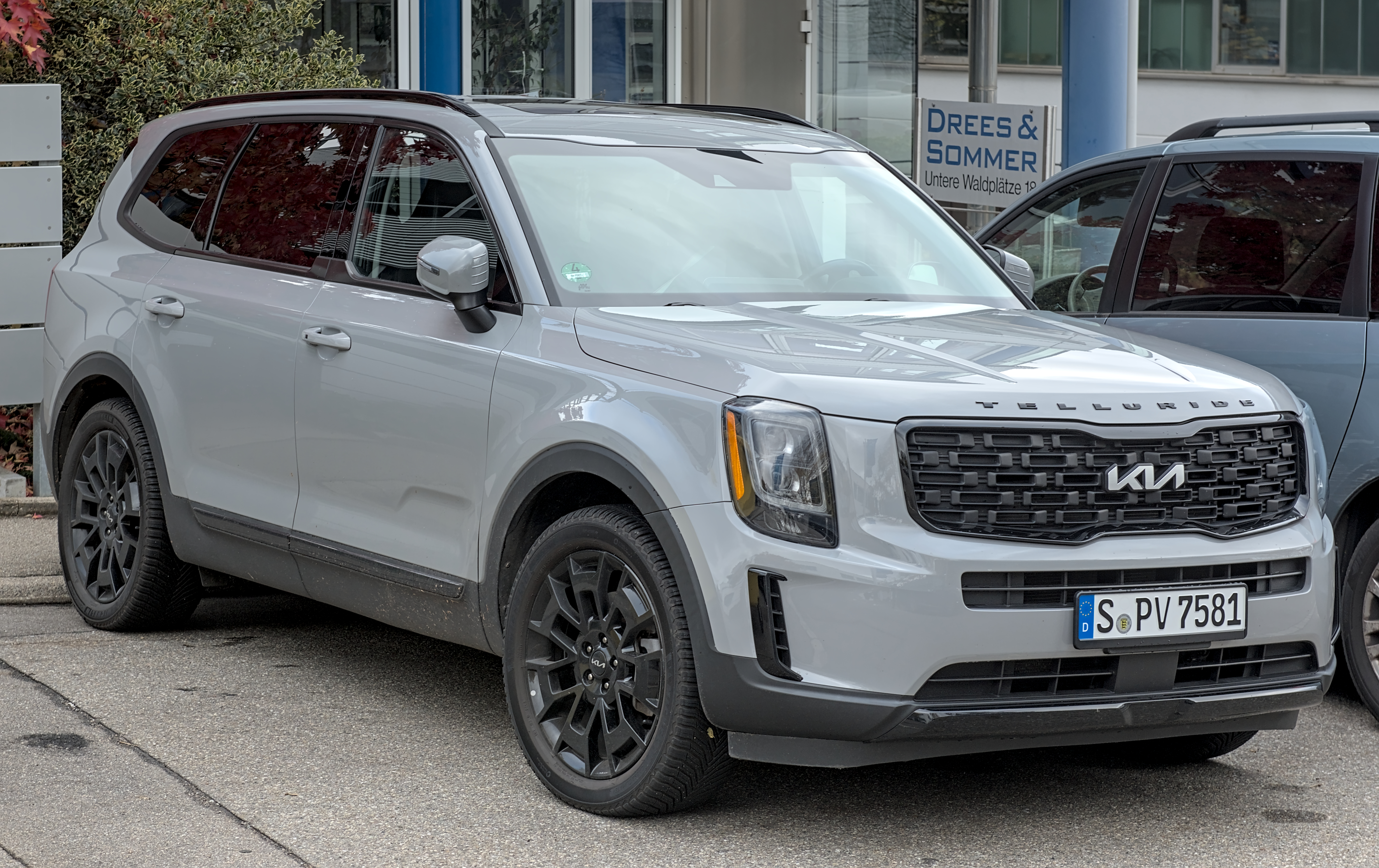
- 2022 Kia Telluride

Overview
- Model code: ON
- Production: February 2019 – January 2026
- Model years: 2020–2025
- Assembly: United States: West Point, Georgia (KMMG)
- Designer: Park Byung-Kyu

Body and chassis
- Related: Hyundai Palisade (LX2)

Powertrain
- Engine: Gasoline: 3.8 L Lambda II GDi V6
- Transmission: 8-speed A8LF1 automatic

Dimensions
- Wheelbase: 2,900 mm (114.2 in)
- Length: 5,001 mm (196.9 in)
- Width: 1,998 mm (78.7 in)
- Height: 1,760 mm (69.3 in)
- Curb weight: 1,865–2,033 kg (4,112–4,482 lb)

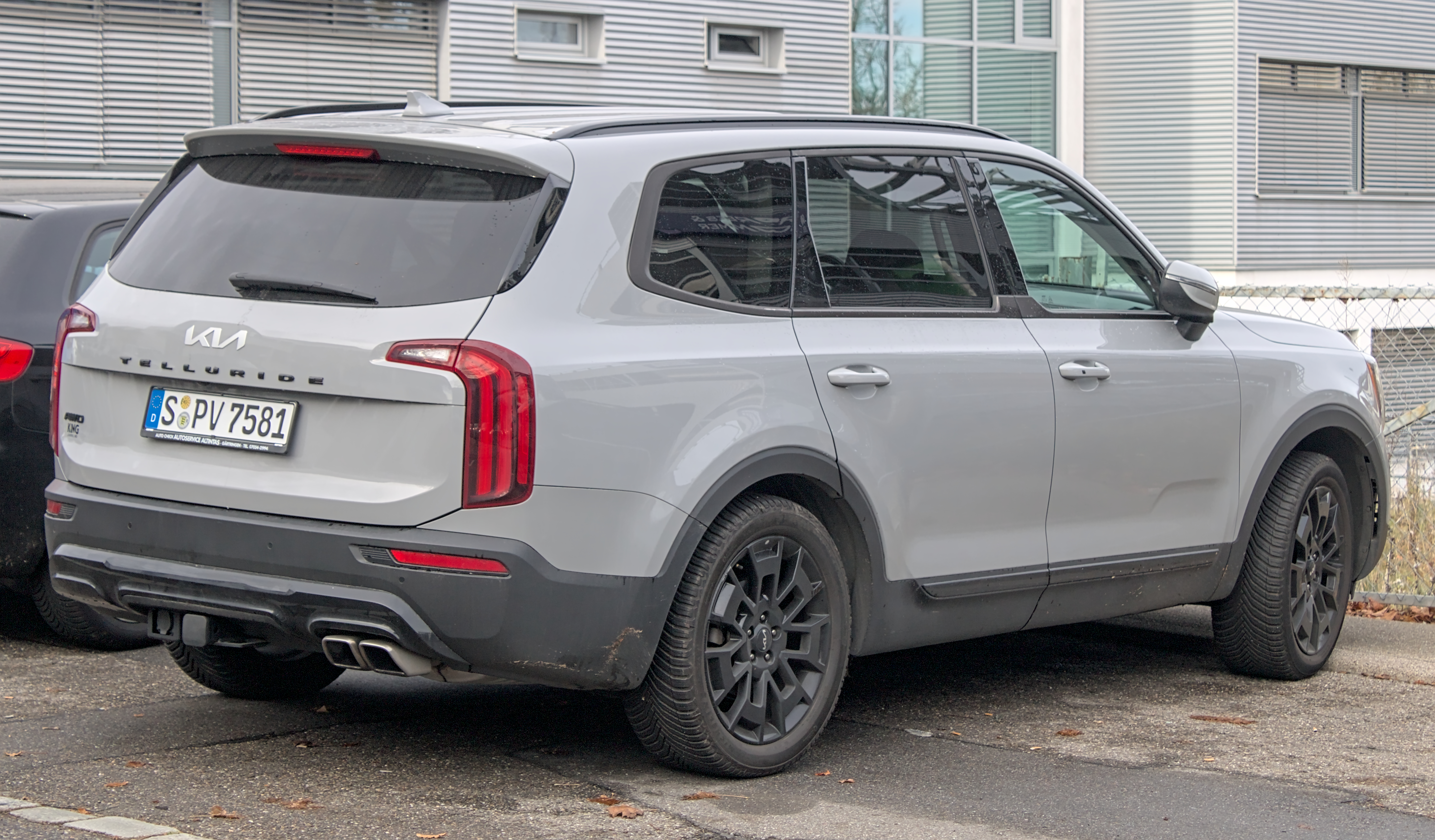
Rear view

The production version of the Telluride was launched at the 2019 North American International Auto Show in January 2019. Previously, the Telluride was displayed as a customized version inspired by fashion designer Brandon Maxwell's Texas-inspired collection, at New York Fashion Week in September 2018. The overall design is similar to the 2016 concept except for the front end which was completely redesigned.

The Telluride is the first Kia designed specifically for the US market, with the design work handled at the Kia Design Center in Irvine, California. The production version Telluride is powered by a 3.8-liter Lambda II V6 Atkinson cycle gasoline engine rated at 291 hp (295 PS; 217 kW) and 355 N⋅m (36.2 kg⋅m; 262 lb⋅ft), paired with an eight-speed automatic transmission and either front-wheel drive or all-wheel-drive.

The Telluride features four drive modes – Smart, Eco, Sport and Comfort. Snow and AWD Lock modes are also available for specific driving conditions, and the on-demand electro-hydraulic AWD system with multi-plate clutch plate constantly redistributes power to both axles. In Eco and Smart modes, power is completely routed to the front wheels, whereas Sport mode splits the power down to 65 percent front, 35 percent rear.

The standard towing rate for this SUV is rated at 5,000 pounds (2,300 kg), and it also features the optional self-levelling rear suspension where the ride height is automatically calibrated depending on vehicle load to optimise control and stability.

The Telluride is not marketed in South Korea as it is only produced in the United States, whereas its Hyundai counterpart, the Korean-built Palisade is marketed there instead. Exports from the West Point, Georgia plant to the Middle East started in February 2019. Kia limited exports of the Telluride to around 3,000 units annually.

=== Trim levels ===
In U.S. and Canada, the Telluride is offered in four trim levels: LX, S, EX, and SX. The latter is offered with an optional "SX Prestige Package," which include several premium features. Since 2021, Kia has offered a "Premium Package" on the EX trim. A 3-seat bench is standard for the second row while captain's chairs can be added, dropping the seating capacity from eight to seven.

All Tellurides are equipped with various features that are otherwise optional in some of its competitors, such as "Sofino" (leatherette)-trimmed or leather-trimmed seating surfaces. Available equipment includes a 10.25-inch touchscreen infotainment system, rear view monitor, 630-watt, 10-speaker Harman Kardon audio system, wireless smartphone charging tray, and head-up display with turn-by-turn navigation, along with heated and ventilated first and second row bucket seats. The Telluride is also equipped with Driver Talk for some trim levels, an in-car intercom system that allows the driver to communicate separately with passengers in the second or third row.

=== 2023 refresh ===
The refreshed 2023 Telluride was unveiled at the New York International Auto Show on April 13, 2022. New convenience technology such as a 12.3-inch instrument panel and an available smart power liftgate with auto-close functionality were added. On the exterior, the grille, headlights, and front bumper were redesigned. More rugged-looking X-Line and X-Pro trims became available since the 2023 model year.

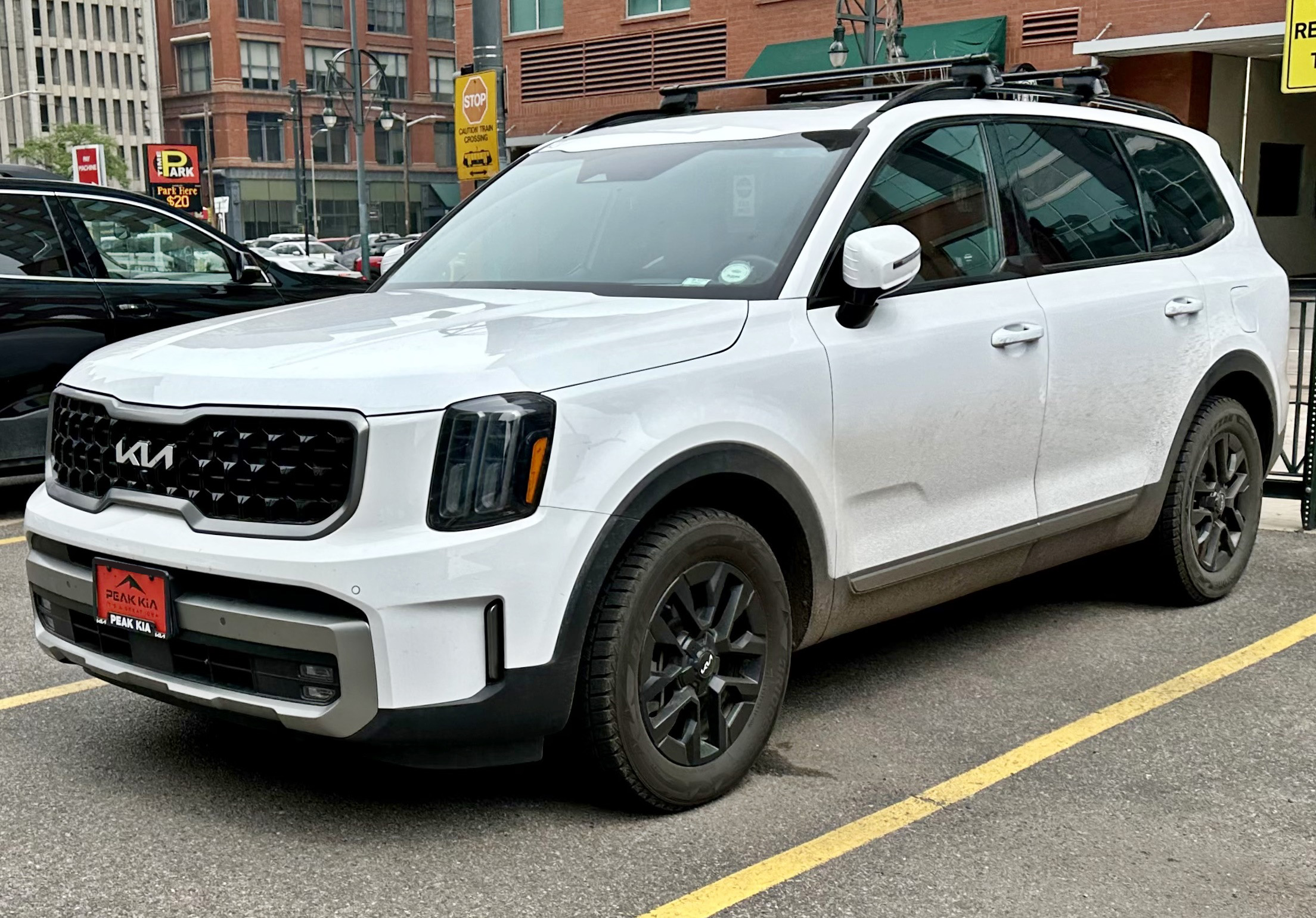
2023 Kia Telluride

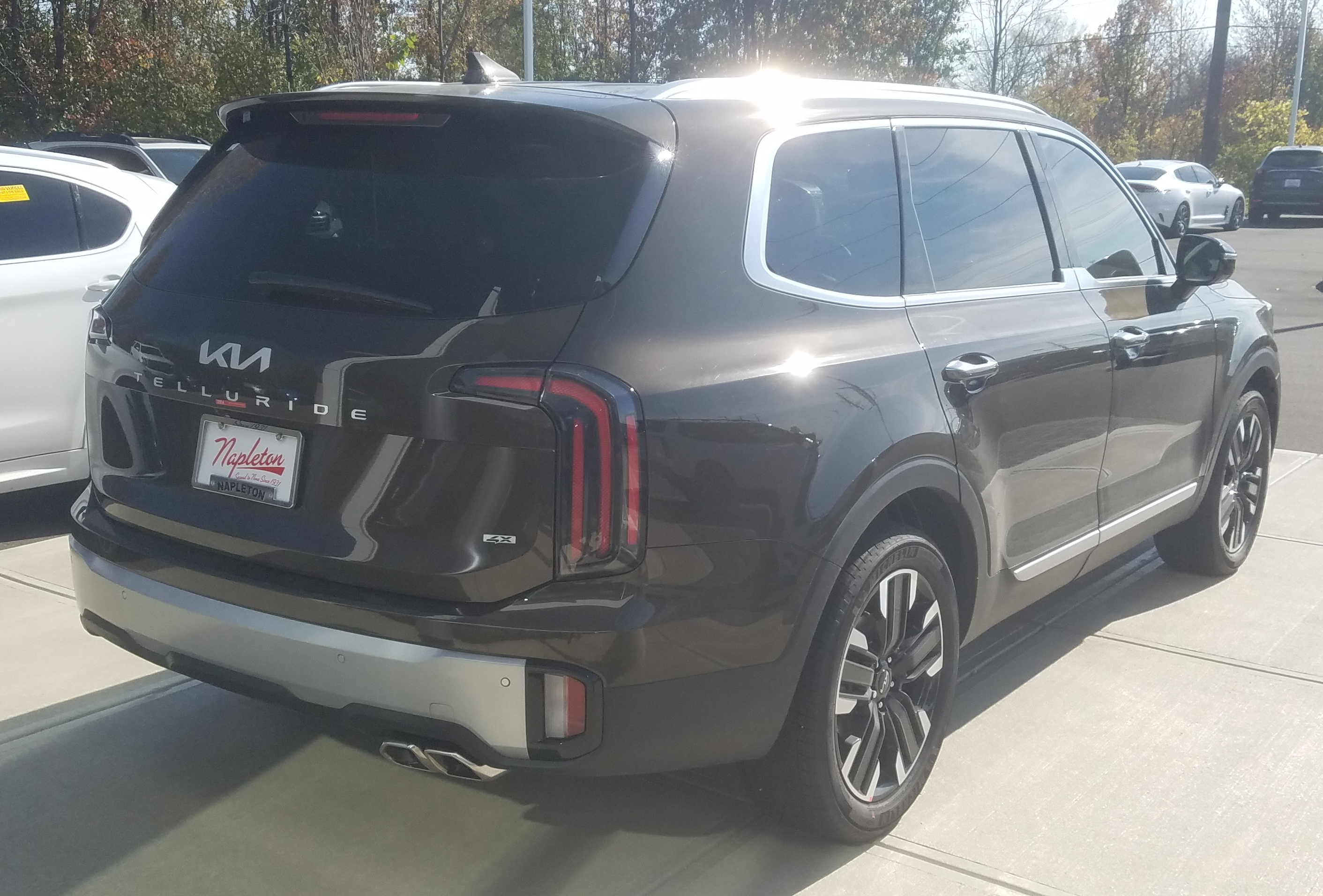
Rear view

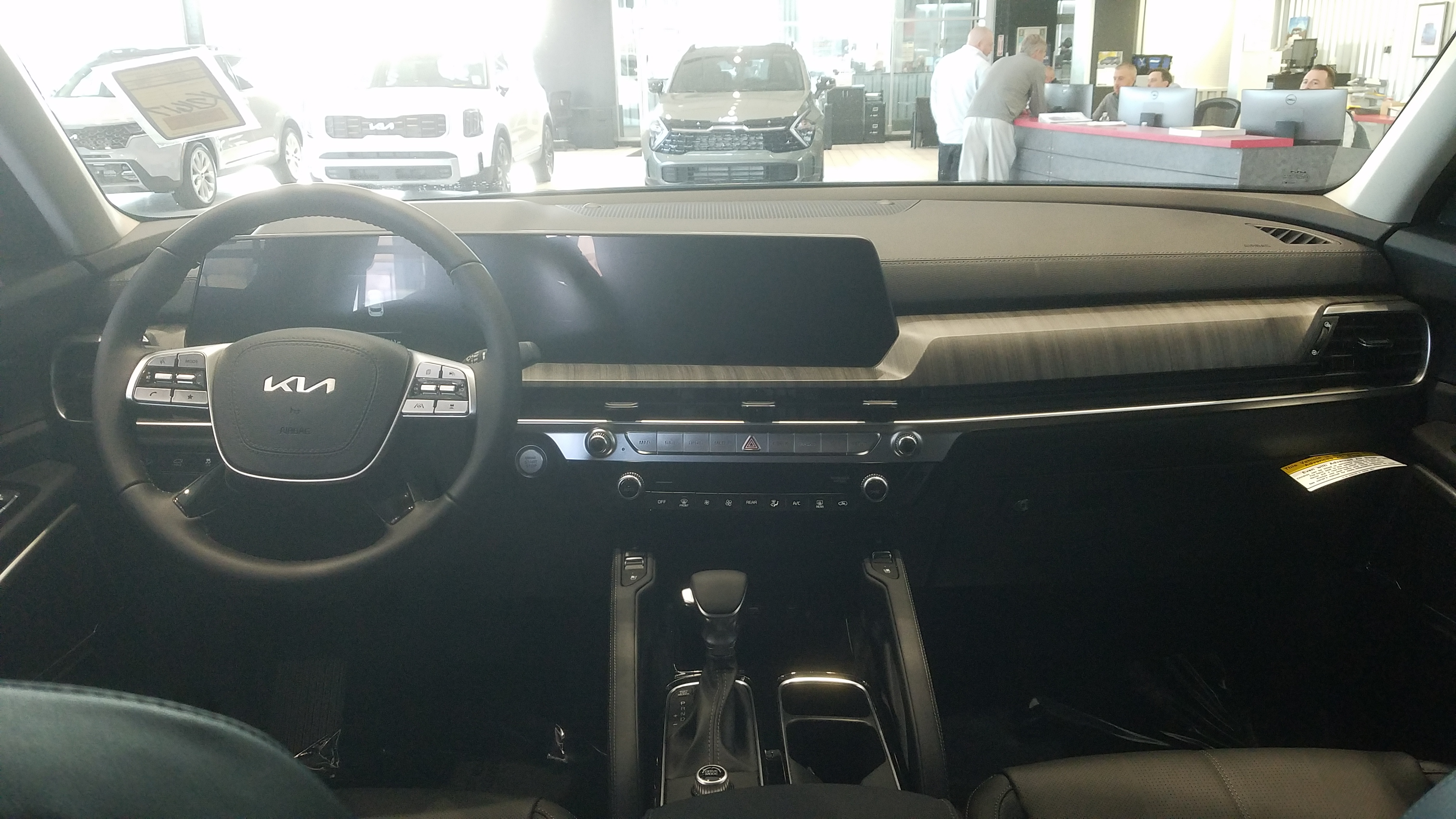
Interior

The exterior was finished in dark pyrite paint and featured a squared off body riding on 22-inch rims, as well as an enlarged tiger nose grille and multiple LED headlamps, consistent with Kia's current design language (as of 2016). The car's suicide doors swung open 90 degrees in opposite directions, revealing a pillarless design. Some of the interior components were 3D printed, marking Kia's first usage of 3D printing technology. It was designed by Tom Kearns from Kia Design Center America.

=== Awards ===
In 2020, the Telluride received the 2020 World Car of the Year as well as Motor Trend's SUV of the Year.

=== Recalls ===
In March 2024, Kia recalled over 427,000 Tellurides from 2020 to 2024 model years, due to rollaway risks which the vehicles rolls away when placed in 'P' gear. According to the National Highway Traffic Safety Administration, this is because of improper assembly of the intermediate shaft and the right front driveshaft could cause unintended vehicle movement, if the driver failed to engage the parking brake. Kia first identified this problem in April 2022 and by then Kia had found 16 vehicles with this problem.

In June 2024, Kia recalled over 462,000 Tellurides from 2020 to 2024 model years, due to potential fire risk caused by the powered front seat motors which can overheat. The issue relates to the misalignment of the powered seats control could get stuck and can feed constant power to the seat motors. According to recall documents, Kia were aware of one driver seat fire incident, six confirmed incidents of melted components under the seats and incidents of interior smoke.

In July 2025, Kia recalled 201,149 Tellurides from 2023 to 2025 model years because the face plates on the exterior door belt moldings could delaminate and detach from the vehicle, creating a road hazard. Dealers replaced affected molding assemblies with versions that used mechanical retention in addition to adhesive.

In February 2026, Kia recalled 85,448 2025 model year Tellurides equipped with power front seats. Improperly manufactured front-seat recliners could prevent the seatbacks from adequately restraining occupants in certain rear-impact collisions. Dealers inspected the vehicles and replaced affected seatback frame assemblies.

=== Safety ===
The 2020 and 2021 model years of the Telluride were awarded "Top Safety Pick" by IIHS, it was later awarded "Top Safety Pick+".

IIHS scores
Small overlap front (driver)	Good	
Small overlap front (passenger)	Good	
Moderate overlap front (original test)	Good	
Side (original test)	Good	
Side (updated test)	Marginal	
Roof strength	Good	
Head restraints and seats	Good	
Headlights (varies by trim/option)	Acceptable	Poor
Front crash prevention: vehicle-to-vehicle	Superior	
Front crash prevention: vehicle-to-pedestrian (Day)	Superior	
Child seat anchors (LATCH) ease of use	Acceptable	

== Second generation (LQ2; 2027) ==
Second generation
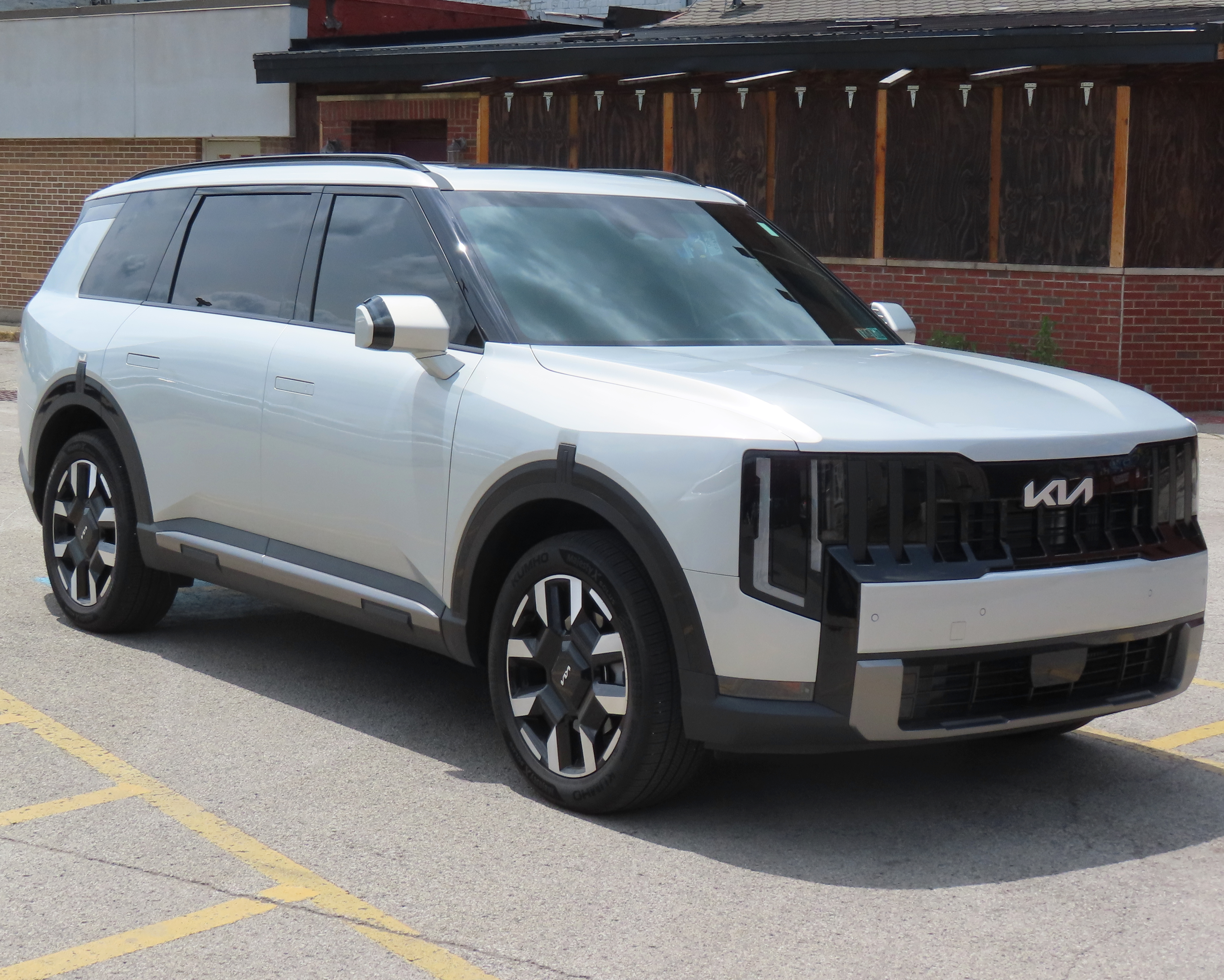
- 2027 Kia Telluride S (US)

Overview
- Model code: LQ2
- Production: February 2026 – present
- Model years: 2027–present
- Assembly: United States: West Point, Georgia (KMMG)
- Designer: Berk Erner

Body and chassis
- Related: Hyundai Palisade (LX3)

Powertrain
- Engine: Gasoline: 2.5 L Smartstream G2.5 T-GDi I4; Gasoline hybrid: 2.5 L Smartstream G2.5 T-GDi Hybrid I4
- Power output: 274 hp (204 kW; 278 PS) (gasoline); 329 hp (245 kW; 334 PS) (gasoline hybrid)
- Transmission: 6-speed automatic (Telluride Hybrid); 8-speed automatic
- Hybrid drivetrain: Parallel

Dimensions
- Wheelbase: 2,970 mm (116.9 in)
- Length: 5,060 mm (199.2 in)
- Width: 1,989 mm (78.3 in)
- Height: 1,765–1,791 mm (69.5–70.5 in)
- Curb weight: 1,987–2,152 kg (4,381–4,744 lb)

The second-generation Telluride was revealed online on November 10, 2025. It made its official debut 10 days later at the 2025 LA Auto Show on November 20, 2025. Deliveries commenced in early 2026 for the 2027 model year while the 2026 model year was entirely skipped.

On February 24, 2026, the first Telluride Hybrid rolled off the West Point assembly line, marking the 5,000,000th vehicle assembled at the plant, the first hybrid Kia to be assembled in the United States, and the first second-generation Telluride to be produced.

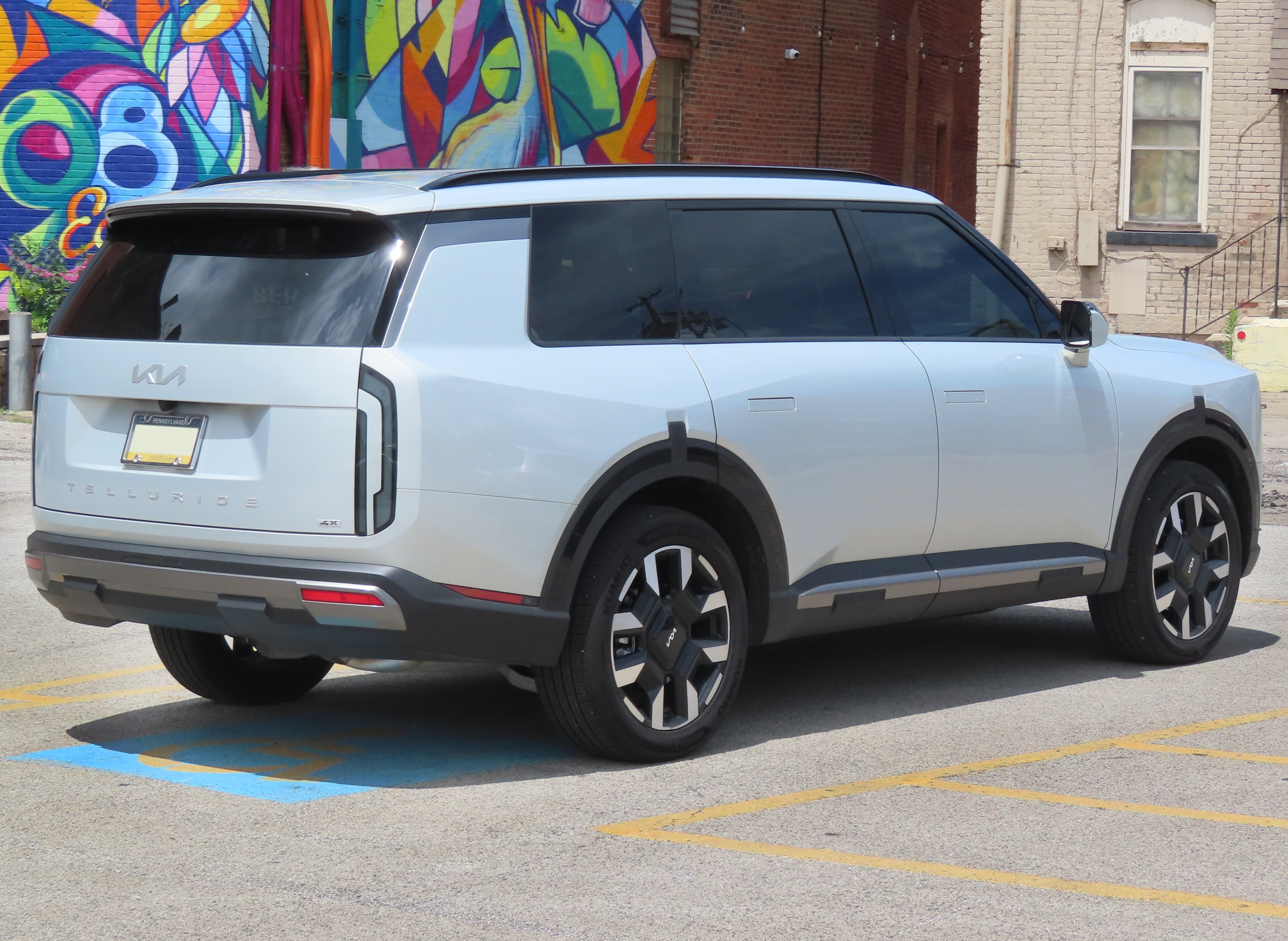
Rear view

Interior

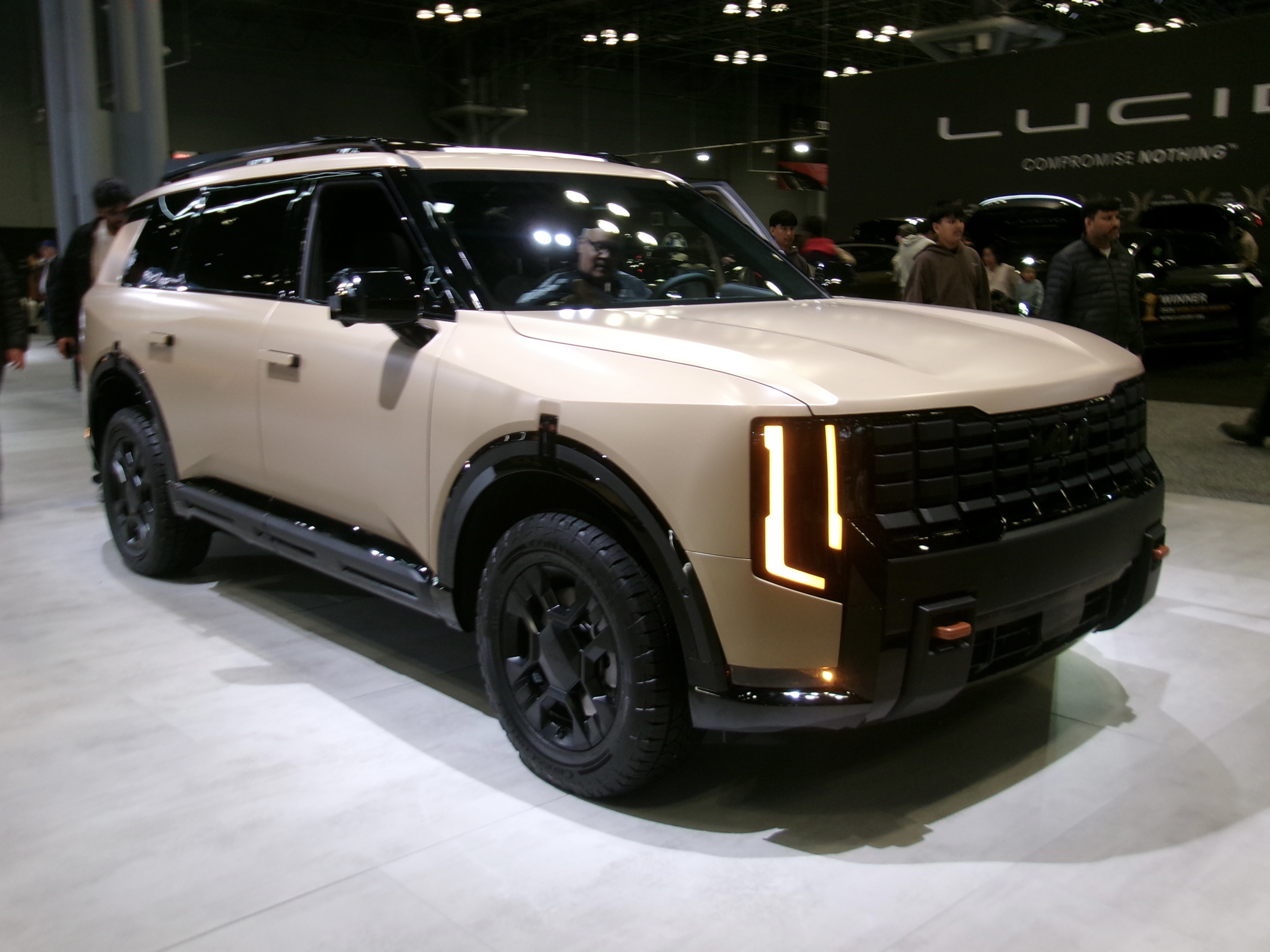
Telluride X-Pro

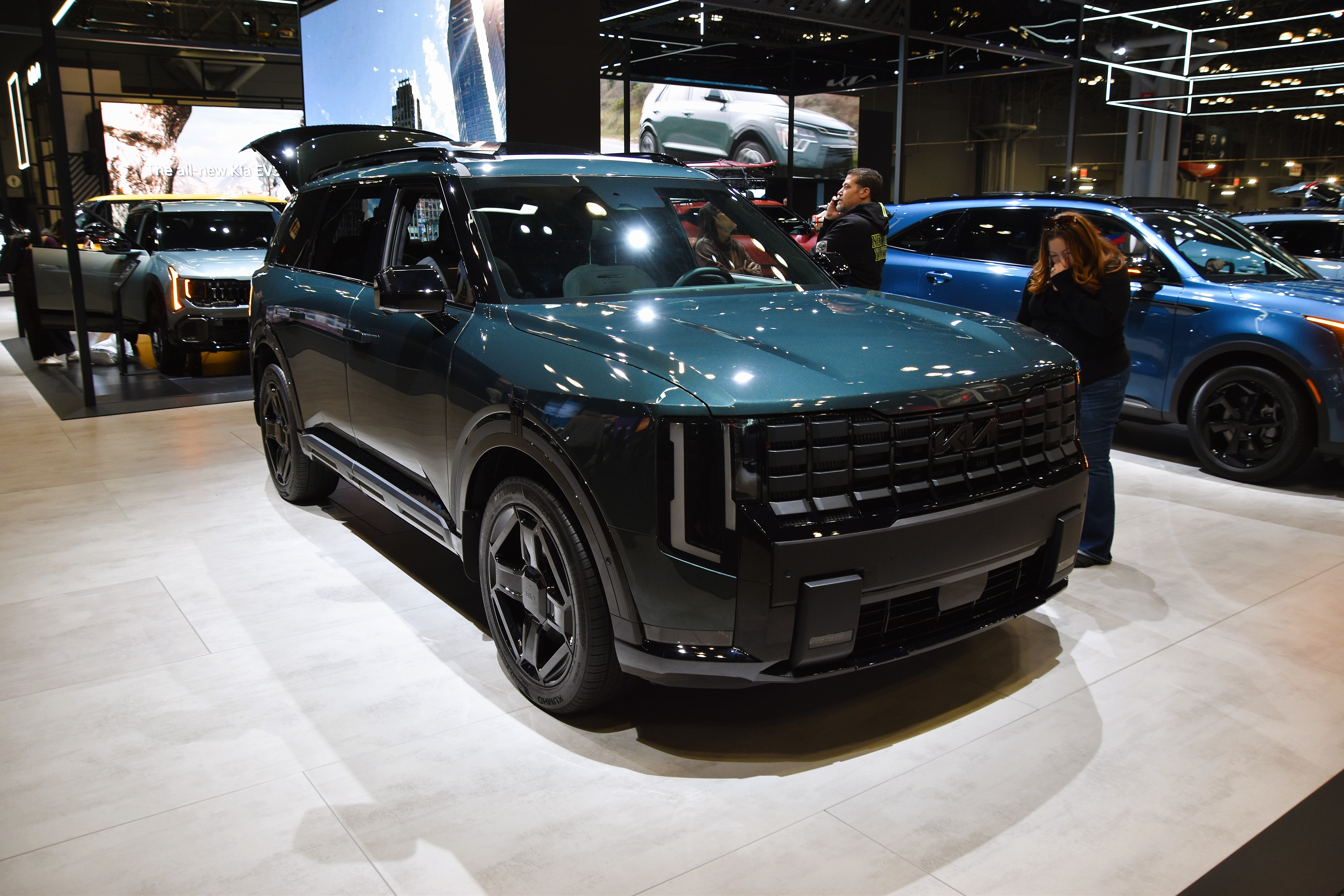
Telluride HEV X-Line

=== Design ===
The Telluride features Kia's Opposites United design philosophy and its design was inspired by the Colorado Rocky Mountains. The exterior of the vehicle is boxier than the previous generation and features vertical headlights and taillights with two vertical light bars, triangular fender creases, and flushed door handles.

=== Features ===
Inside, the Telluride is equipped with Kia’s Connected Car Navigation Cockpit (ccNC) operating system with two 12.3-inch panoramic displays, and there is also a small touchscreen display for the HVAC system housed between the instrument cluster and the central infotainment system. The dashboard features physical controls used for the HVAC system and to adjust the audio volume. The center console features two wireless charging pads and integrated grab handles. The gear selector used for the automatic transmission is relocated from the center console to the steering wheel column and also houses the engine start/stop button.

=== Powertrain ===
The base engine for the second-generation Telluride is a 2.5 T-GDi turbocharged four-cylinder gasoline engine producing 274 hp (204 kW; 278 PS) and 311 lb⋅ft (422 N⋅m), replaced the 3.8-liter Lambda II V6 gasoline engine used in the previous model. The Telluride is also available with a 2.5 T-GDi Hybrid turbocharged four-cylinder gasoline hybrid engine producing a combined output of 329 hp (245 kW; 334 PS) and 339 lb⋅ft (460 N⋅m), and it also became the first hybrid electric vehicle (HEV) from Kia to be produced at the Kia Manufacturing Georgia (KMMG) plant.

Sang Lee, Product Planning National Manager at Kia America, explained the reasons about downsizing the engine used for the second-generation Telluride because "the naturally aspirated V6 is technically, at this point, inferior to the four-cylinder turbo", the 2.5 T-GDi engine is able to comply with the California Air Resources Board's Advanced Clean Cars II regulation which limits emissions from vehicles produced from the 2026 model year onwards, and torque output from the 2.5T-GDi engine used to move the increased weight of the Telluride which is 265 lb (120 kg) heavier than its predecessor.

=== Trim levels ===
In the US, the Telluride is available with five trim levels: LX, S, EX, SX, and SX Prestige. The X-Line styling package is available on the EX except for the Hybrid model, SX and SX Prestige grades. While the X-Pro off-road focused package is available on the SX and SX Prestige grades, except for the Hybrid models. The Hybrid model is available with the EX, SX and SX Prestige trims. All-wheel drive is optional on the S, EX and SX trims, and standard on the SX Prestige trim.

The off-road focused X-Pro model features a 9.1 in (231 mm) ground clearance, 18-inch alloy wheels in all-terrain tires, electronic limited slip differential (e-LSD), self-leveling rear suspension, a Terrain mode for the drive modes, front and rear recovery hooks, gloss black front grille, gloss black exterior elements, raised roof rails, Ground View Monitor, and Ground Lighting.

=== Recalls ===
In March 2026, Kia recalled 13,499 2027 model year Tellurides because the third-row center seat belt buckle could fail to latch properly and might not adequately restrain an occupant during a collision. Dealers inspected the buckle assemblies and replaced them when necessary.

Later that month, Kia recalled 568 2027 model year Telluride Hybrid SX Prestige and X-Line SX Prestige vehicles equipped with the Executive Package. The powered second-row seats could fail to detect an obstruction and continue moving while an occupant was seated or entering or leaving the rear of the vehicle, increasing the risk of injury.

In June 2026, Kia recalled 6,264 2027 model year Telluride and Telluride Hybrid vehicles because an incorrect sensor in the driver's seat belt assembly could cause the emergency locking retractor to lock while the belt was being extended. The affected vehicles did not comply with Federal Motor Vehicle Safety Standard 209. Dealers replaced the driver's seat belt assembly.

== Sales ==
Calendar year	U.S.	Canada
2019	58,604	2,997
2020	75,129	2,853
2021	93,705	4,270
2022	99,891	
2023	110,765	
2024	115,504	
2025	123,281	
