= Hyundai Palisade =

Mid-size crossover SUV

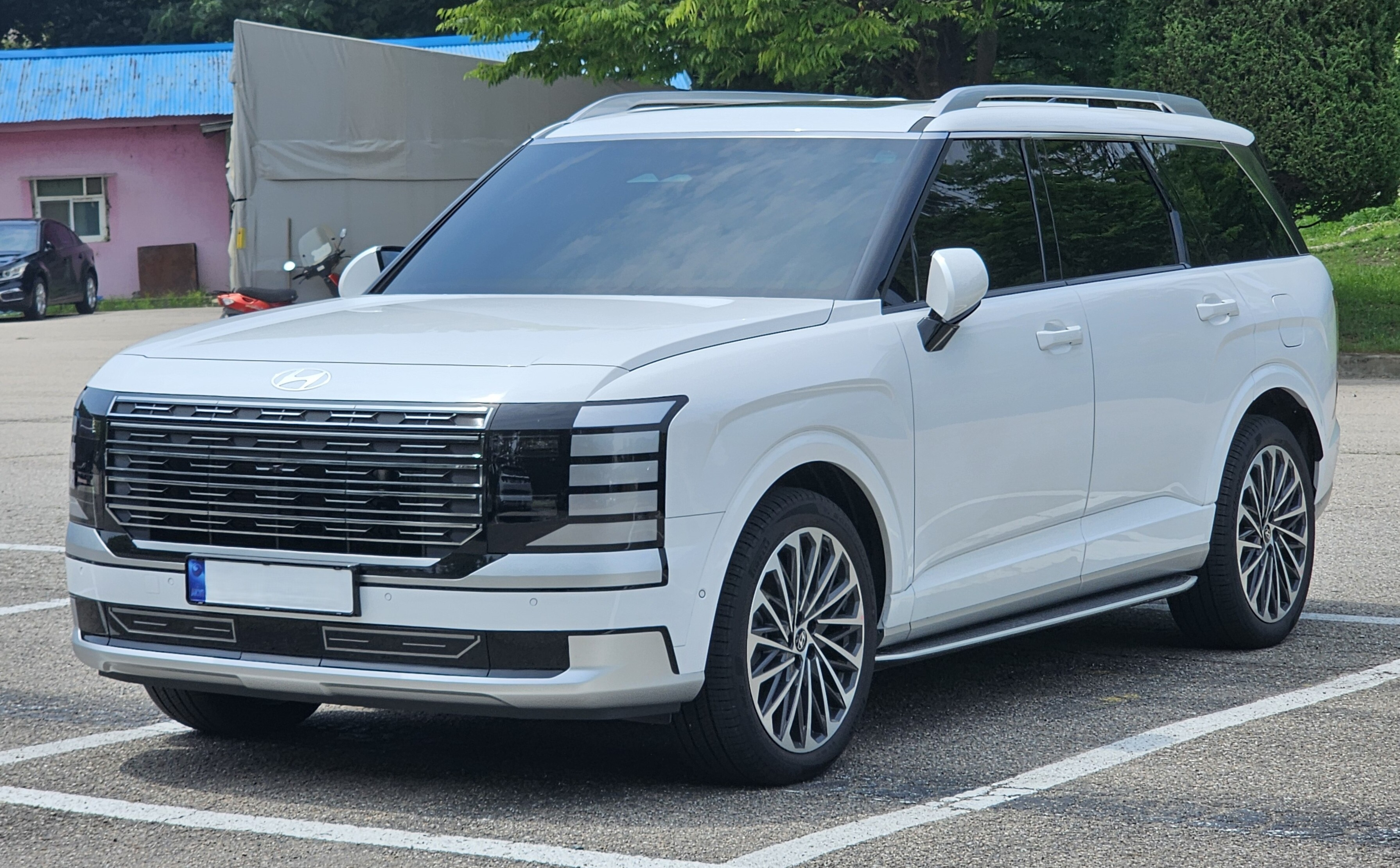
- Second-generation Palisade

Overview
- Manufacturer: Hyundai
- Production: 2018–present
- Model years: 2020–present

Body and chassis
- Class: Mid-size crossover SUV (E)
- Body style: 5-door SUV
- Layout: Front-engine, front-wheel-drive; Front-engine, all-wheel-drive
- Chassis: Unibody
- Related: Kia Telluride

Chronology
- Predecessor: Hyundai Maxcruz/Santa Fe XL

The Hyundai Palisade (Korean: 현대 팰리세이드) is a mid-size crossover SUV with three-row seating manufactured and marketed by Hyundai Motor Company since late 2018.

The Palisade replaced the Maxcruz (also known as Santa Fe XL outside of South Korea) as the flagship SUV under the Hyundai brand. A second-generation Palisade was introduced for the 2026 model's first hybrid powertrain.

The term palisade can refer to a bluff or cliff along a body of water, and Hyundai associated the model name with Pacific Palisades in Southern California.

== First generation (LX2; 2018) ==
First generation
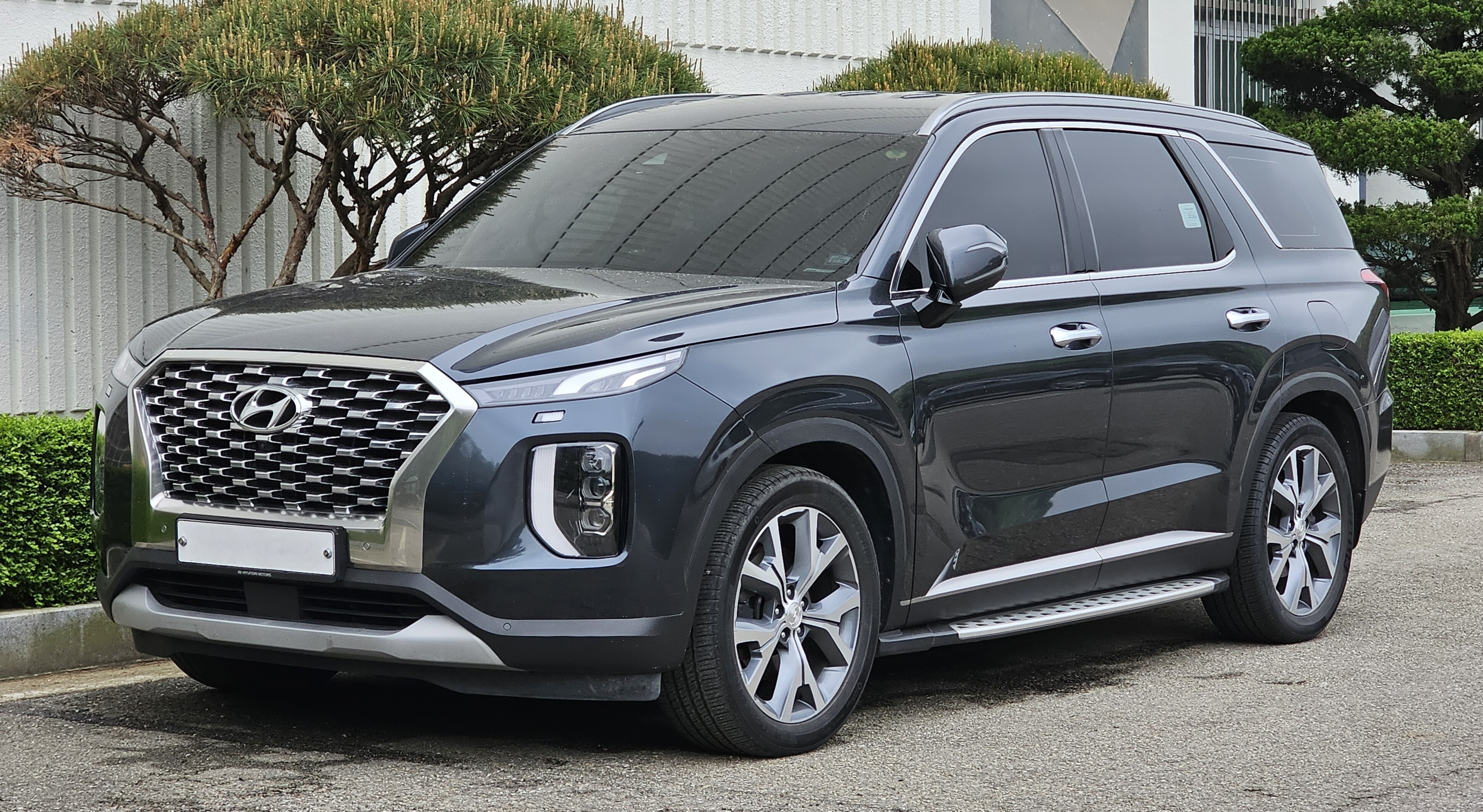

Overview
- Model code: LX2
- Production: 2018–2025
- Model years: 2020–2025
- Assembly: South Korea: Ulsan (Ulsan Plant 2·4·5); Russia: Kaliningrad (Avtotor); Vietnam: Ninh Bình (HTMV)
- Designer: Kim Jun-Ho, Seo Jin-Hwan and Kim Gil-Ho

Body and chassis
- Platform: Hyundai-Kia N1/N2
- Related: Kia Telluride (ON)

Powertrain
- Engine: Petrol: Lambda II 3.5L MPi V6; Lambda II 3.8L GDi V6; Diesel: R II 2.2L CRDi I4
- Transmission: 8-speed A8LF1/A8LF2 automatic

Dimensions
- Wheelbase: 2,900 mm (114.2 in)
- Length: 4,980 mm (196.1 in) (pre-facelift); 4,995 mm (196.7 in) (facelift)
- Width: 1,975 mm (77.8 in)
- Height: 1,750 mm (68.9 in)
- Curb weight: 1,820–2,060 kg (4,012–4,542 lb)

=== Overview ===
The first-generation Palisade debuted at the 2018 Los Angeles Auto Show on 28 November 2018, following Hyundai's Grandmaster concept unveiled in June 2018. At launch, it was positioned as Hyundai's largest SUV and flagship three-row model, measuring 4,980 mm (196.1 in) long with a wheelbase of 2,900 mm (114.2 in). It has 21 cu ft (595 L) of cargo space behind the third row and 87 cu ft (2,464 L) with both rows folded down. Like its predecessor, the Palisade features three rows of seating, with seating for up to eight passengers when equipped with a second-row bench seat or seven passengers with the optional second-row captain seat. The model had a coefficient drag of 0.33.

Introduction of the right-hand drive model started in December 2020 in Australia and Indonesia. CKD assembly in Russia started in 2020 by Avtotor for domestic sales.

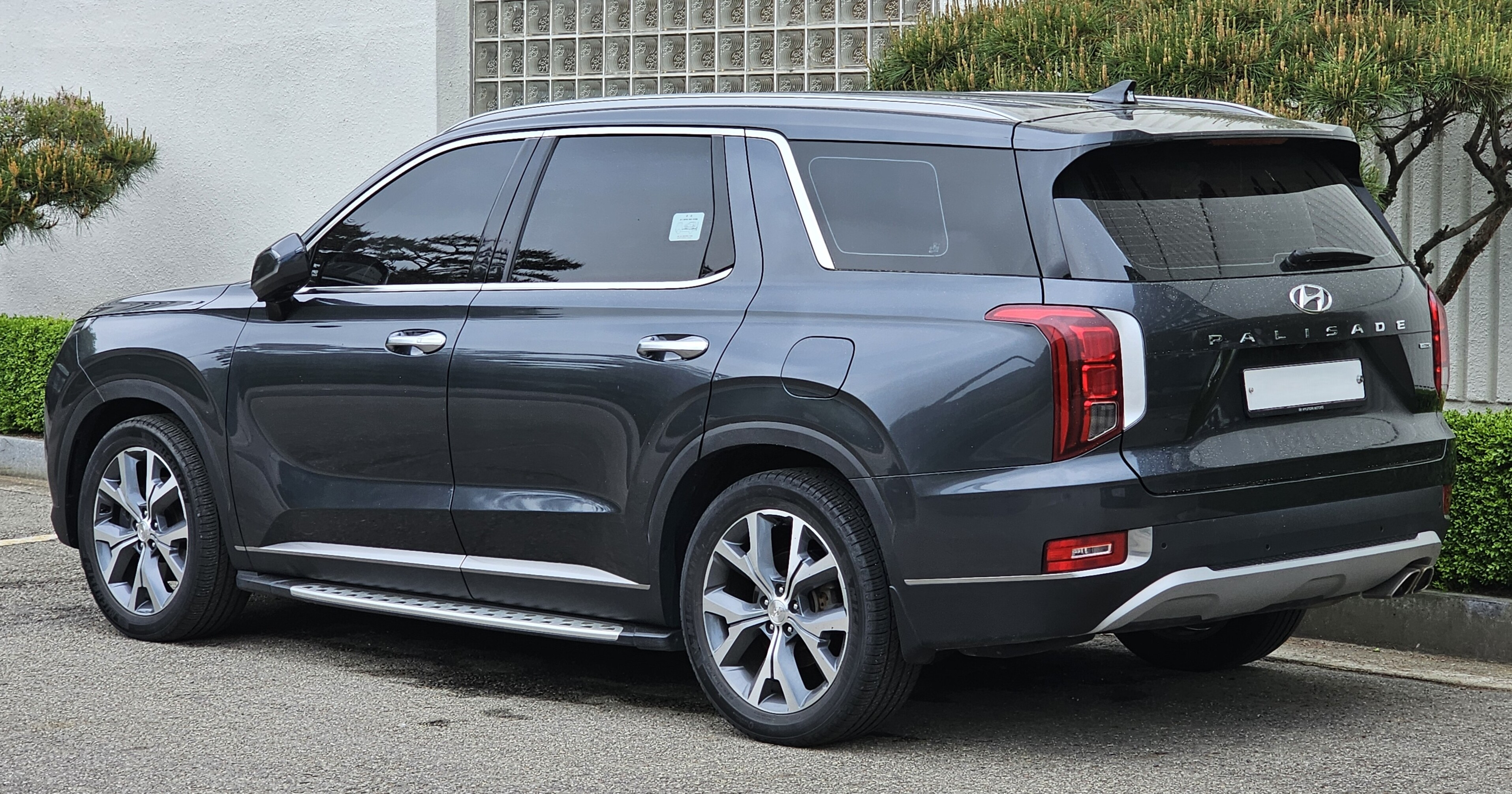
Rear view

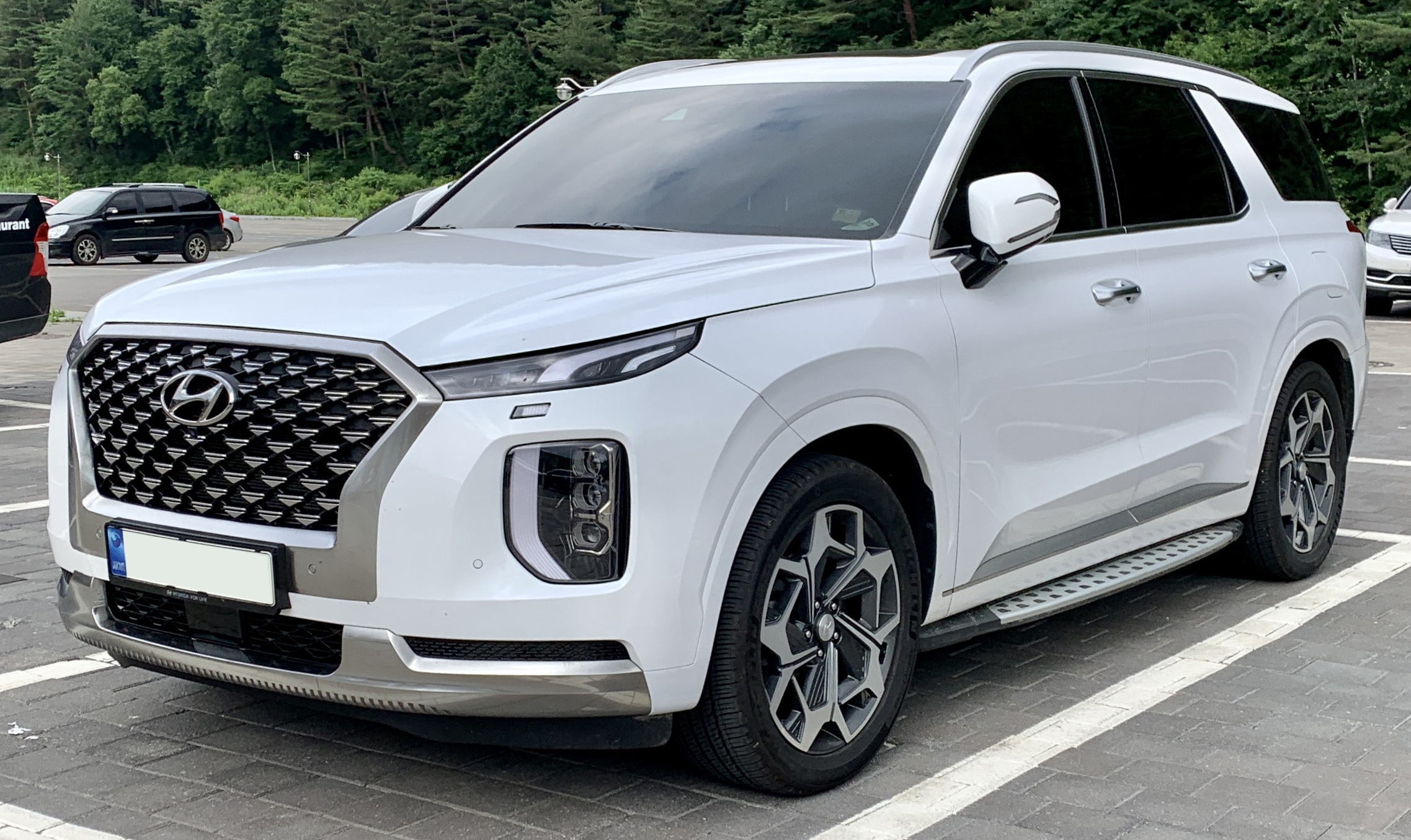
Palisade Calligraphy (pre-facelift)

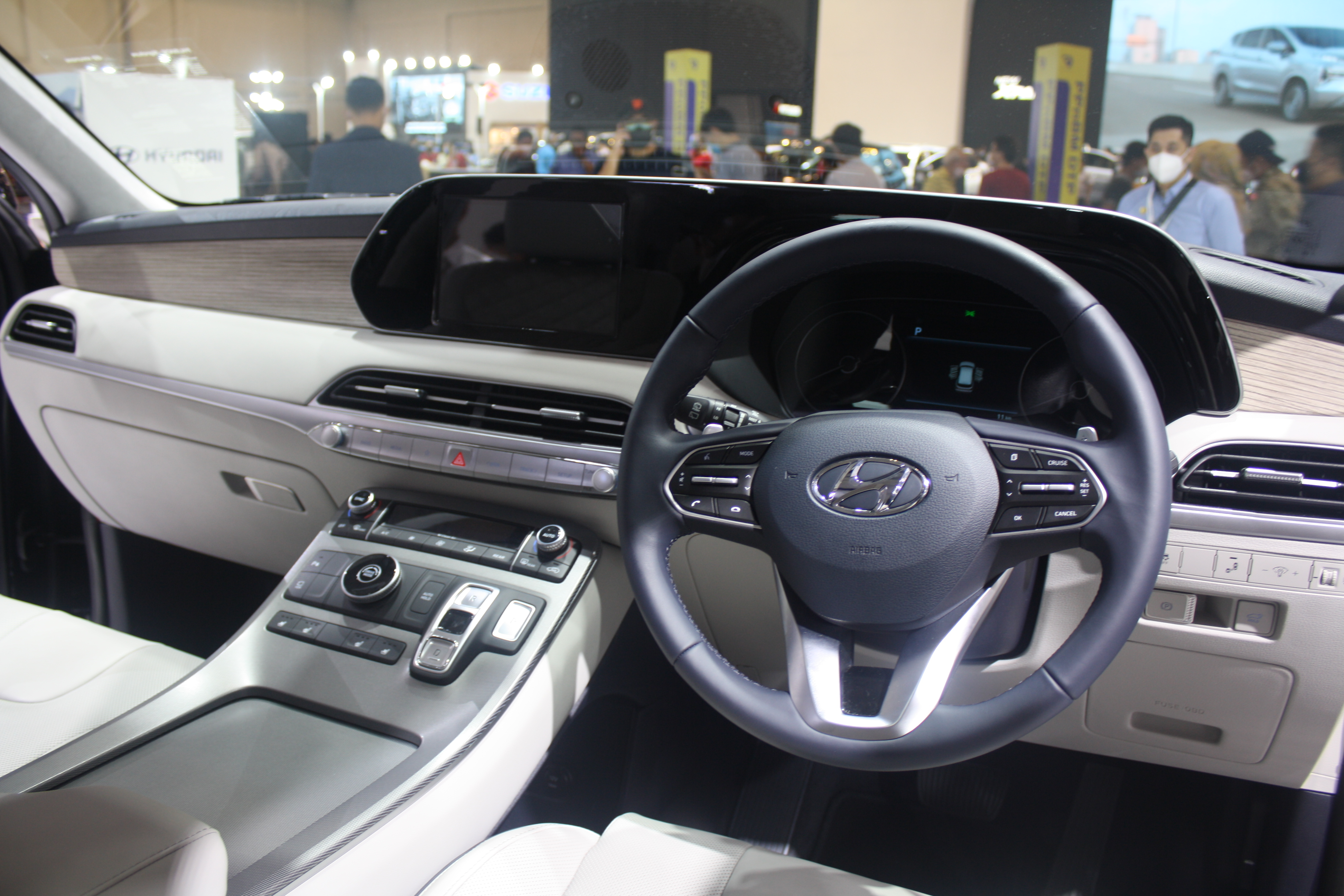
Interior

=== Markets ===
==== Asia ====
===== Indonesia =====
The Palisade went on sale in Indonesia in January 2021 after December 2020 introduction. It is offered in Prime and Signature trim levels with all-wheel drive only available for the latter trim and all variants use a 2.2-litre turbo-diesel engine. The facelifted model debuted in July 2022. The XRT variant was made available in June 2024.

===== Malaysia =====
The Palisade was launched in Malaysia on 16 December 2021. At launch, it is offered in Luxe and Exec variants with available 7- and 8-seater configurations and available with two engine option; a 3.8-litre V6 petrol front-wheel drive (Luxe) or 2.2-litre turbo-diesel all-wheel drive (Exec). The facelifted model debuted in January 2023 with same seating configuration and engine options as the pre-facelift model.

===== Philippines =====
The Palisade was launched in the Philippines in April 2019. At launch, it was offered as a sole variant with 2.2-litre turbo-diesel engine and a 7-seat configuration. The facelifted model debuted in January 2023 only available on special order.

===== Singapore =====
The Palisade was launched in Singapore on 30 April 2021 in a sole variant with a 8-seater configuration and uses a 3.5-litre V6 petrol engine. The facelifted model was introduced in January 2023 and was offered in a seven-seat configuration.

===== South Korea =====
In South Korea, the Palisade was launched on 11 December 2018 as Hyundai's flagship SUV, with 2.2-litre diesel and 3.8-litre gasoline engine options. The first-generation model was produced at Hyundai's Ulsan plant complex. The car sold faster than expected in South Korea, with over 52,000 units sold by February 2019. The unprecedented demand led to significant delays in supply throughout 2019, with customers having to wait up to 9 months to receive their vehicle. The K-pop group BTS was chosen as the brand ambassador for the new model of Hyundai and have since been involved in numerous commercials and ad campaigns in South Korea and U.S.

===== Thailand =====
The Palisade was launched in Thailand on 8 November 2024 with a facelifted model. Imported from Vietnam, it is offered in Exclusive 2WD and Prestige AWD trim levels all variants use a 2.2-litre turbo-diesel engine.

===== Vietnam =====
The Palisade was launched on 15 September 2023 in Vietnam as a local assembled model at HTMV plant in Ninh Bình. It is offered in Exclusive and Prestige trim levels with 6 and 7-seater configurations and all variants use a 2.2-litre turbo-diesel engine.

==== North America ====
Trim levels available for the Palisade in the United States and Canada are the base preferred, essential with optional Convenience Package or Convenience and Premium Package, Limited, and top-of-the-line Calligraphy (since 2021 model year). Powering all Palisade models is a 3.8-litre Atkinson cycle V6 engine with Idle Stop & Go (ISG).

==== Oceania ====
===== Australia =====
The Palisade was released in Australia in December 2020, after the right-hand drive model was finalized. At launch, It is available in either 7- or 8-seater configuration on the Highlander trim and 8 seater on the standard trim. The Palisade is available with either a 3.8-litre V6 petrol front-wheel drive or 2.2-litre turbo-diesel all-wheel drive. The Elite trim (which sits between the standard and Highlander trim levels) was added in August 2021. The facelifted model debuted in August 2022, with the standard trim discontinued. The Highlander was replaced by the Calligraphy trim and the Calligraphy trim is available with the Black Ink styling package.

===== New Zealand =====
The Palisade was launched in New Zealand on 13 January 2021, with two trim levels: Elite (8-seater) and Limited (7-seater). For engines, both trims were available with either a 3.8-litre V6 petrol (2WD) or 2.2-litre turbo-diesel (AWD).

==== Russia ====
The Palisade was launched to the Russian market in December 2020 with 2.2-litre turbo-diesel engine and 3.5-litre V6 petrol engine rated at 249 hp (186 kW). It was locally assembled at the Avtotor plant in Kaliningrad.

==== South Africa ====
The Palisade was launched in South Africa on 13 August 2021. It is offered in a sole Elite trim with available 7- and 8-seater configurations and use a 2.2-litre turbo-diesel engine. The facelifted model debuted in February 2023.

=== Facelift ===
The updated Palisade debuted for the North American market at the New York International Auto Show on 13 April 2022, for the 2023 model year. It features a revised front end, and an enhanced infotainment system with 12-inch navigation.

In South Korea, the updated Palisade was released on 19 May 2022, following its physical release at the 2022 New York International Auto Show. The thickness of the sound-absorbing material was increased and the shock-absorbing device was improved. In addition, technologies such as Digital Key 2 and second-row ventilation seats became an option.

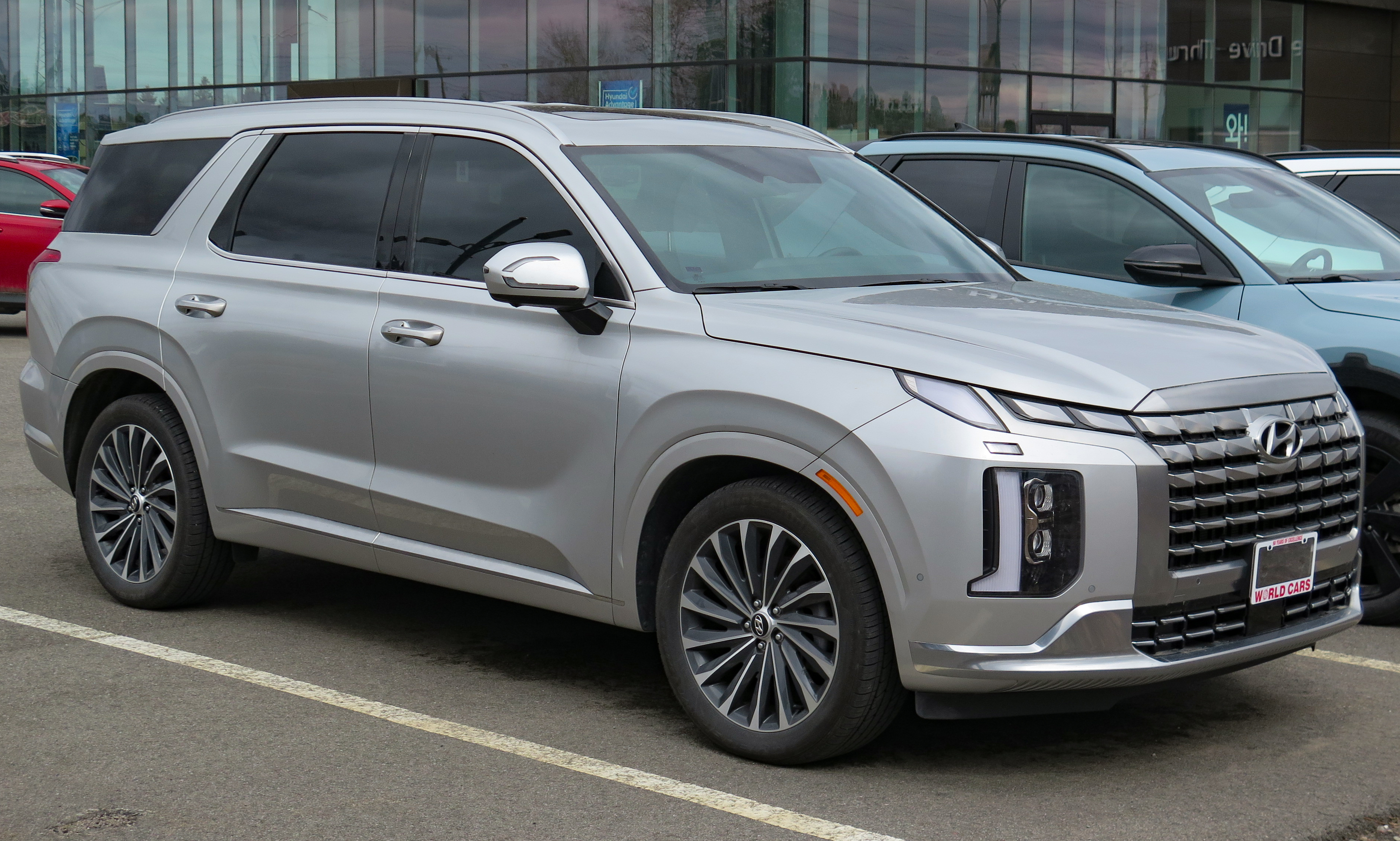
Palisade Calligraphy (facelift)

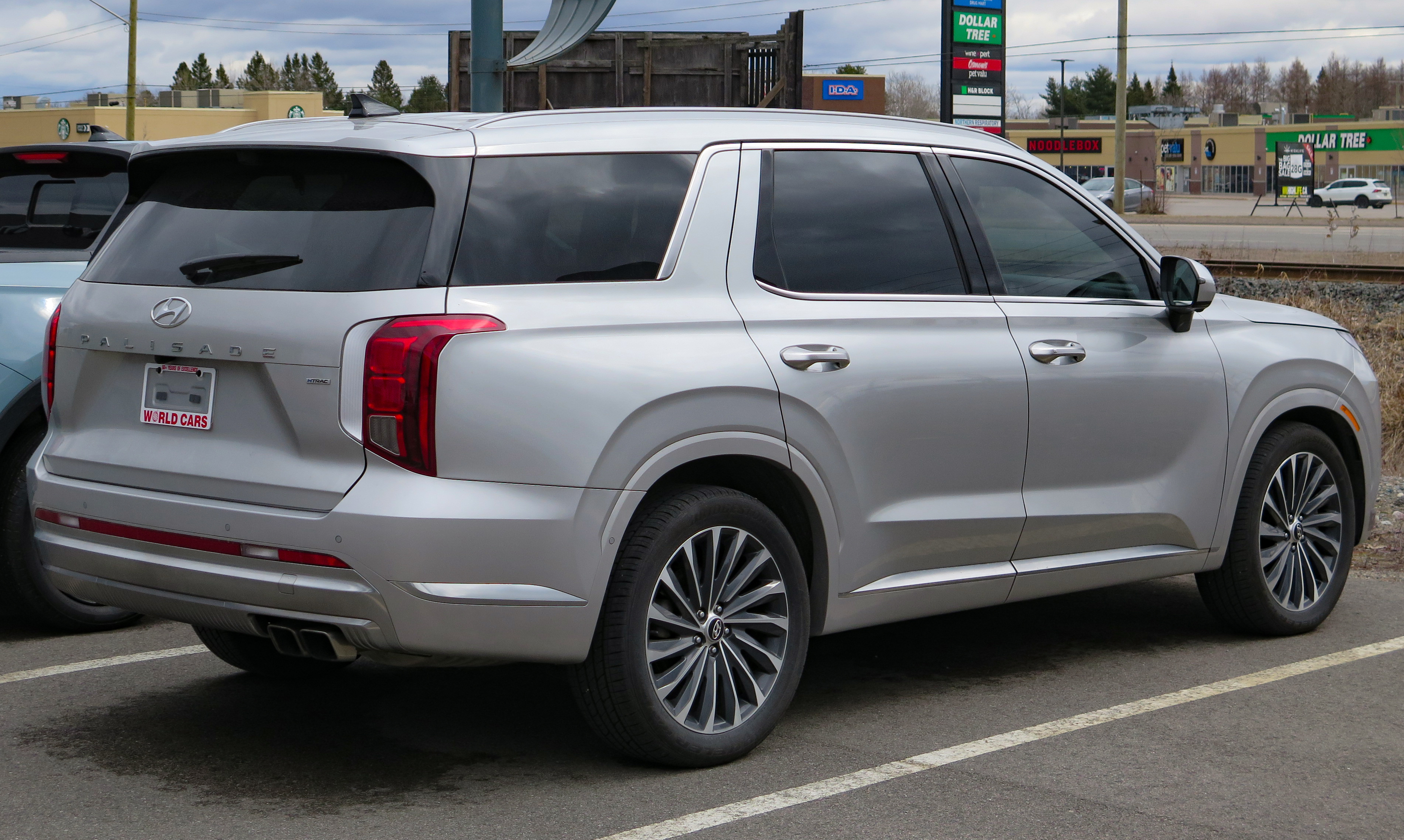
Rear view

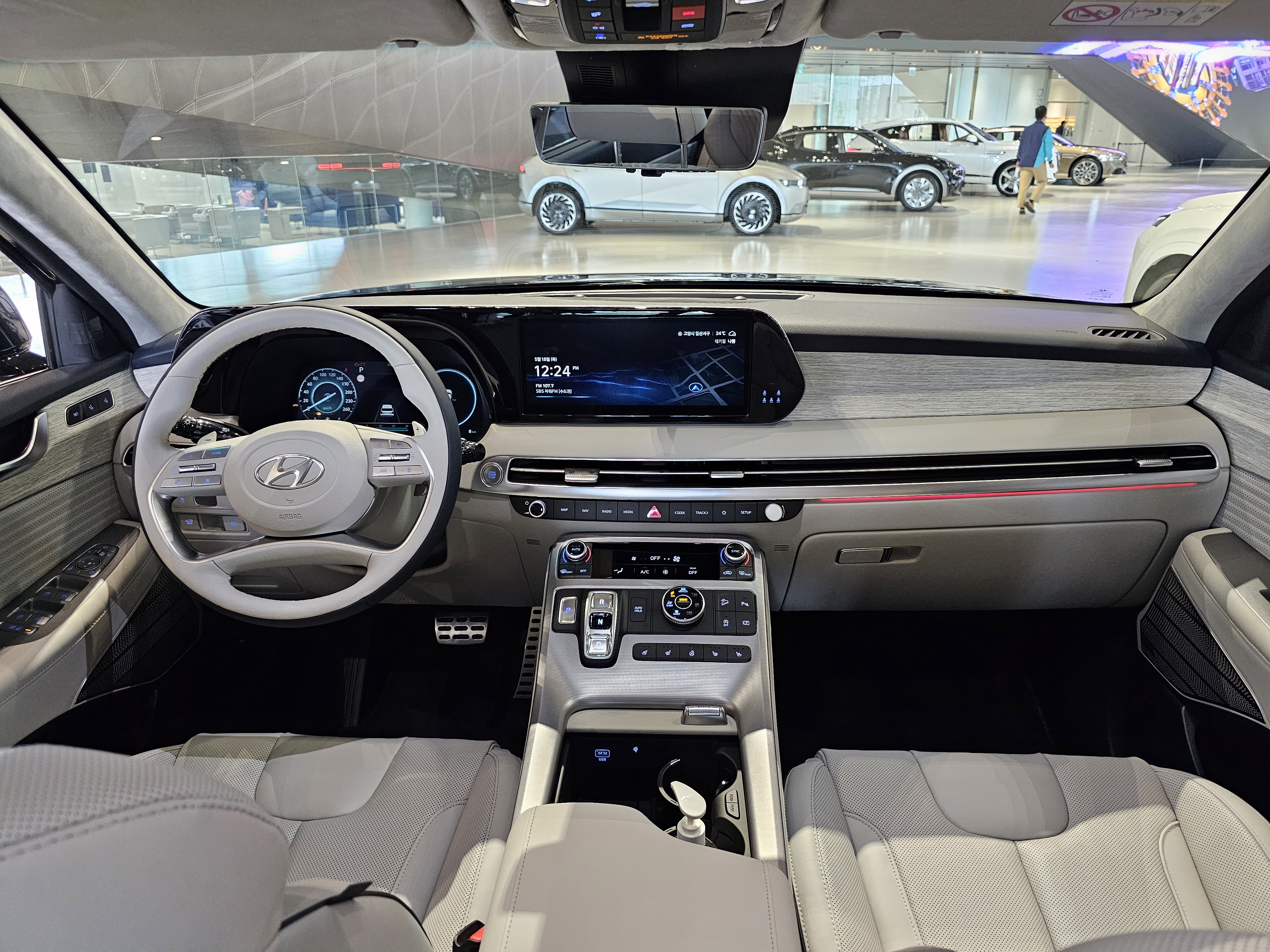
Interior

=== Powertrain ===
Specs
Model	Year	Transmission	Power	Torque	0–100 km/h (0-62 mph) (Official)	Top speed
Petrol
Lambda II 3.5 MPi	2018–present	8-speed automatic	249 PS (183 kW; 246 hp) @ 6,300 rpm	34.2 kg⋅m (335 N⋅m; 247 lbf⋅ft) @ 5,000 rpm	8.1s (AWD)	210 km/h (130 mph)
Lambda II 3.5 MPi	2018–present	8-speed automatic	277 PS (204 kW; 273 hp) @ 6,300 rpm	34.2 kg⋅m (335 N⋅m; 247 lbf⋅ft) @ 5,000 rpm	8.2s (FWD); 8.1s (AWD)	210 km/h (130 mph)
Lambda II 3.8 GDi	2018–present	8-speed automatic	295 PS (217 kW; 291 hp) @ 6,000 rpm	36.2 kg⋅m (355 N⋅m; 262 lbf⋅ft) @ 5,200 rpm	7.8s (FWD); 7.7s (AWD)	210 km/h (130 mph)
Diesel
R II 2.2 CRDi	2018–present	8-speed automatic	193–200 PS (142–147 kW; 190–197 hp) @ 3,800 rpm	45 kg⋅m (441 N⋅m; 325 lbf⋅ft) @ 1,750–2,750 rpm	10.2s (FWD); 10.5s (AWD)	190 km/h (118 mph)

=== Safety ===
The Palisade was awarded "Top Safety Pick" and "Top Safety Pick+" (from 2021 to 2023 model years) by IIHS.

IIHS scores (2020)
Small overlap front (driver)	Good	
Small overlap front (passenger)	Good	
Moderate overlap front (original test)	Good	
Side (original test)	Good	
Side (updated test)	Marginal	
Roof strength	Good	
Head restraints and seats	Good	
Headlights (varies by trim/option)	Good	Marginal
Front crash prevention: vehicle-to-vehicle	Superior	
Front crash prevention: vehicle-to-pedestrian (Day)	Superior	
Child seat anchors (LATCH) ease of use	Acceptable	

ANCAP test results Hyundai Palisade LX2 diesel variants (Australia & New Zealand) (2022, aligned with Euro NCAP)
Test	Points	%
Overall:	4/5 stars	
Adult occupant:	30.21	79%
Child occupant:	43.24	88%
Pedestrian:	34.33	63%
Safety assist:	10.19	63%

ANCAP test results Hyundai Palisade all Australian & New Zealand variants (2022, aligned with Euro NCAP)
Test	Points	%
Overall:	5/5 stars	
Adult occupant:	32.21	84%
Child occupant:	43.24	88%
Pedestrian:	34.75	62%
Safety assist:	13.41	83%

== Second generation (LX3; 2024) ==
Second generation
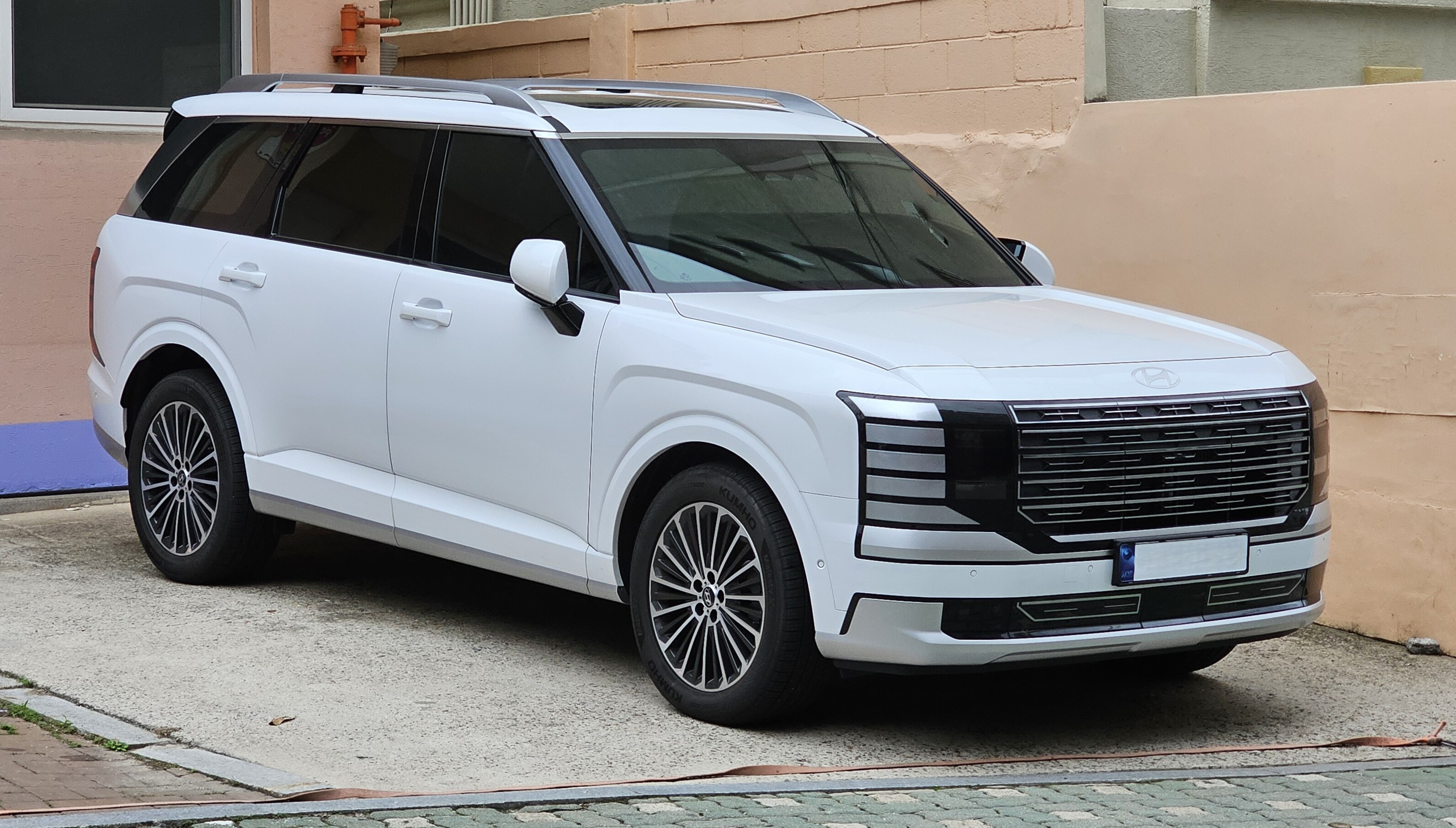
- 2026 Hyundai Palisade Calligraphy

Overview
- Model code: LX3
- Production: 2024–present
- Model years: 2026–present
- Assembly: South Korea: Ulsan (Ulsan Plant 2); Vietnam: Ninh Bình (HTMV)

Body and chassis
- Related: Kia Telluride (LQ2)

Powertrain
- Engine: Petrol: 2.5 L Smartstream G2.5 T-GDi I4; 3.5 L Smartstream G3.5 GDi V6; Petrol hybrid: 2.5 L Smartstream G2.5 T-GDi Hybrid I4
- Transmission: 6-speed automatic (Palisade Hybrid); 8-speed automatic
- Hybrid drivetrain: Parallel hybrid

Dimensions
- Wheelbase: 2,970 mm (116.9 in)
- Length: 5,060–5,090 mm (199.2–200.4 in)
- Width: 1,980 mm (78.0 in)
- Height: 1,805 mm (71.1 in)
- Curb weight: 1,985–2,165 kg (4,376–4,773 lb)

The second generation Palisade was unveiled on 6 December 2024.

The Palisade has a boxy shape for the exterior design. The exterior design elements include vertical rectangular LED headlights with LED daytime running lights, a thin LED light strip across the upper section of the grille, a silver-finished D-pillar trim piece on the side, and a minimalistic rear fascia. The vertical taillights resemble the headlights, the rear wiper is hidden underneath the roof spoiler, and a faux skid plate on the lower part of the rear bumper conceals the exhaust pipes.

Inside, the 12.3-inch touchscreen infotainment and instrument cluster screens are housed within the wraparound design of the upper dashboard. The lower part of the dashboard features the air-con vents and the physical switches. The centre console is disconnected from the dashboard, providing additional storage space below and features a wireless charger, 100W USB charging outlet and storage cubby. The gear selector used for the automatic transmission is relocated from the centre console to the steering wheel column.

In South Korea, the Palisade is offered with a 9-seat configuration for the first time, alongside the 7-seat layout, with the front centre console folding down to form an additional middle seat in the front row; the nine-seat version is also eligible to use the country's bus-only lanes. With a 3-seat bench in both the second and third rows, this brings the total to nine seats; the second row is alternatively available with captain's chairs, while the third row has a 60:40 split-folding bench as standard.

In January 2026, the Palisade was named the 2026 North American Utility Vehicle of the Year at the Detroit Auto Show, ahead of the Lucid Gravity and Nissan Leaf finalists.

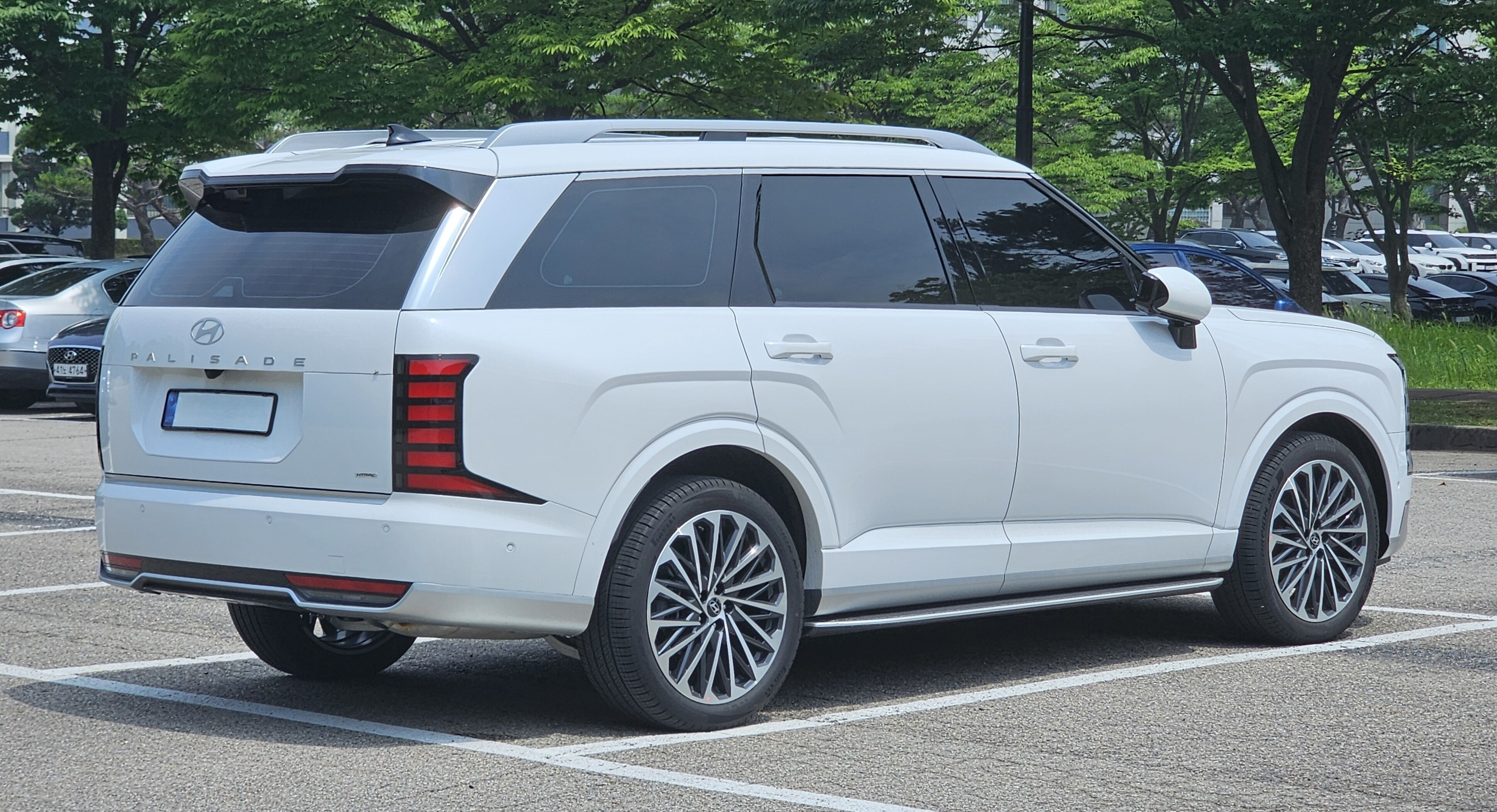
Rear view

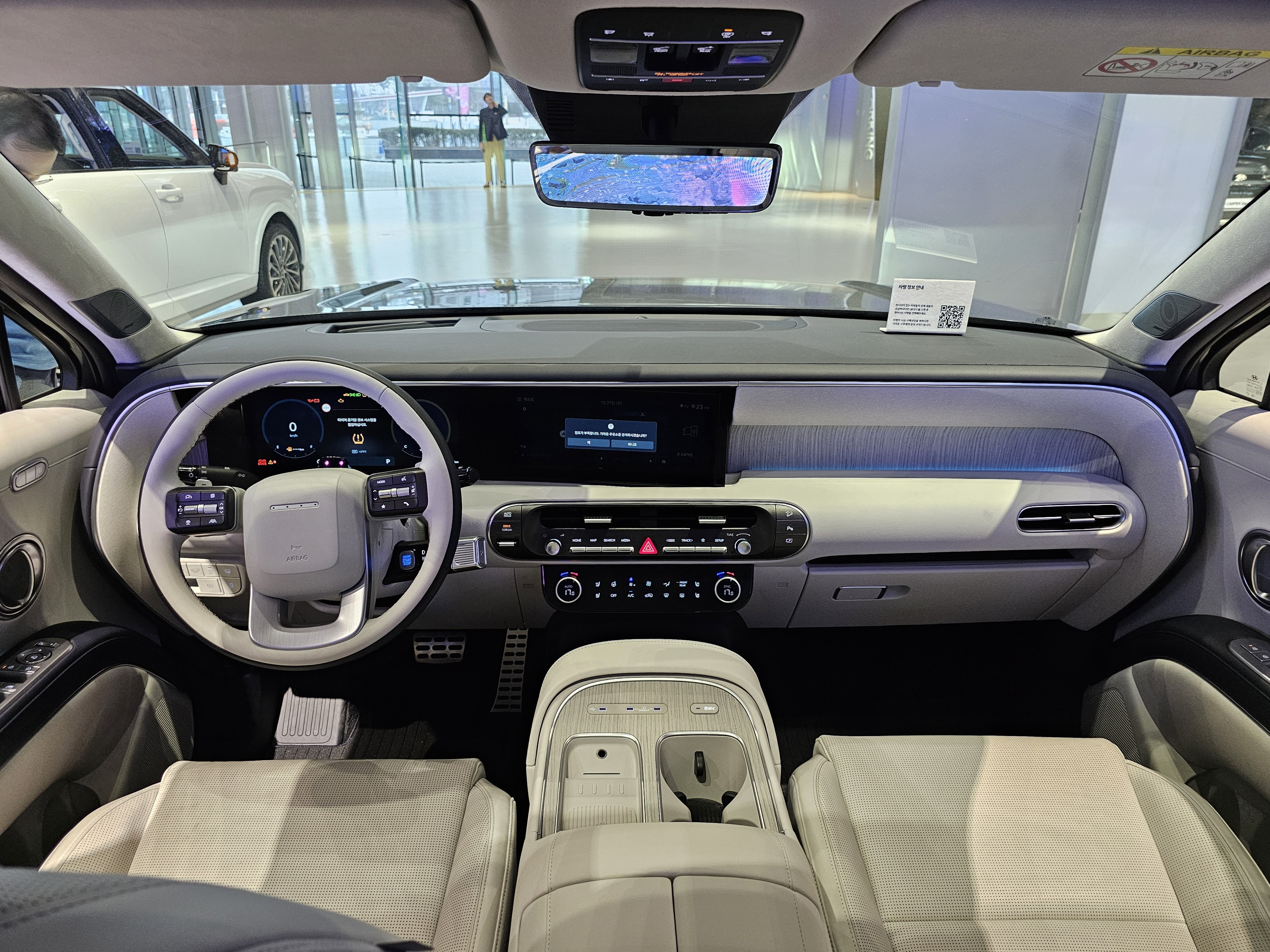
Interior

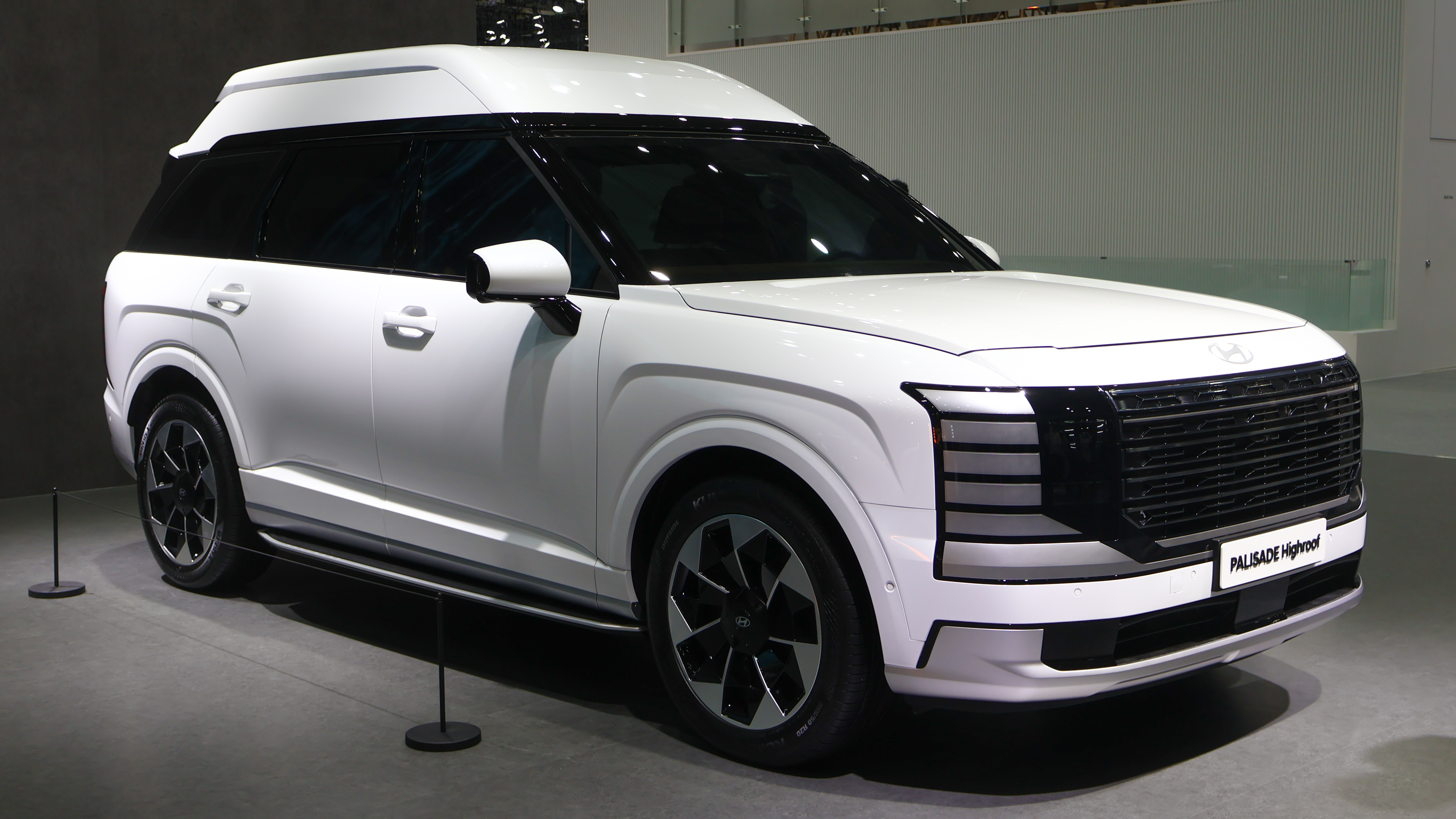
Palisade Highroof

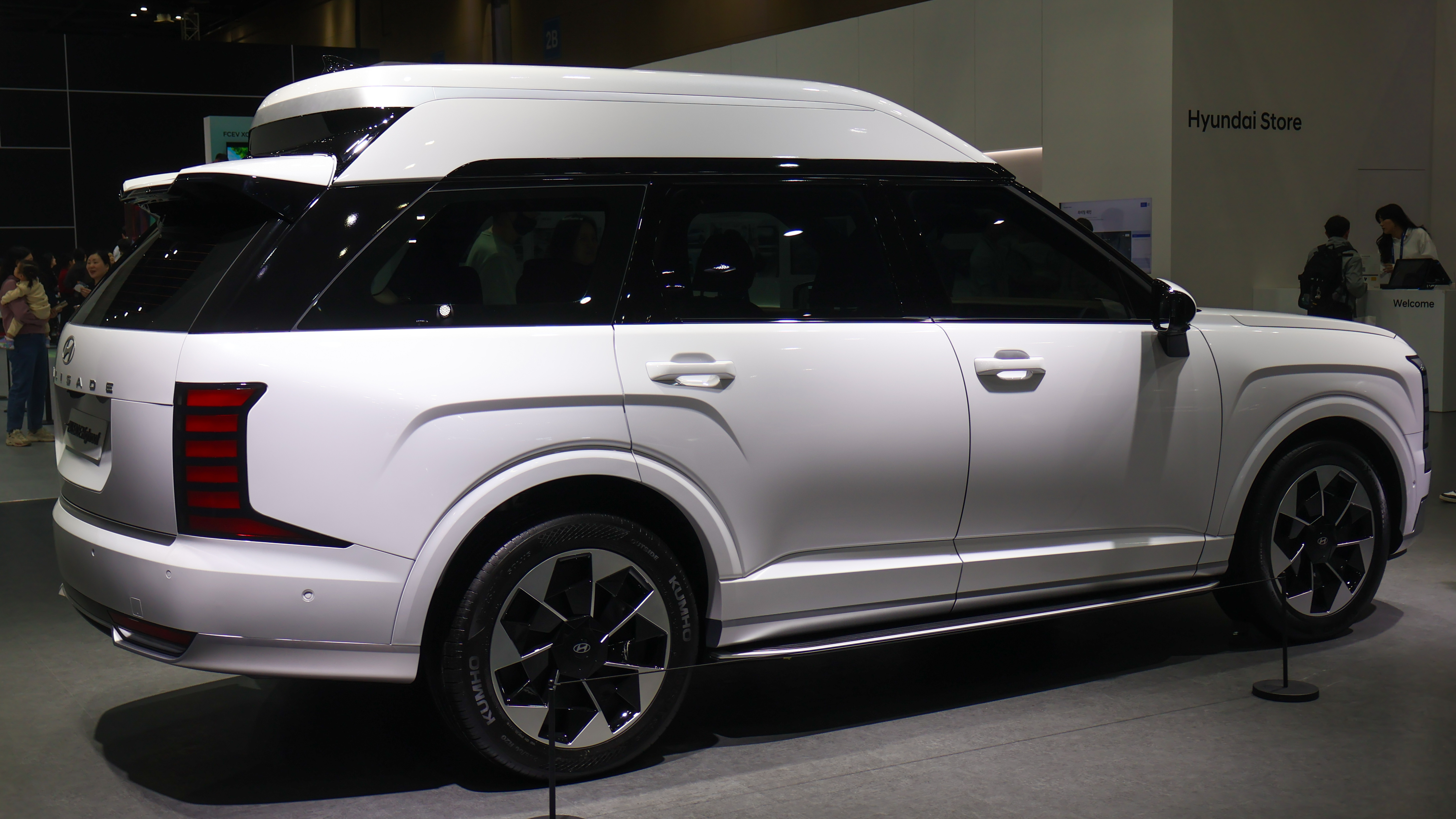
Rear view (Highroof)

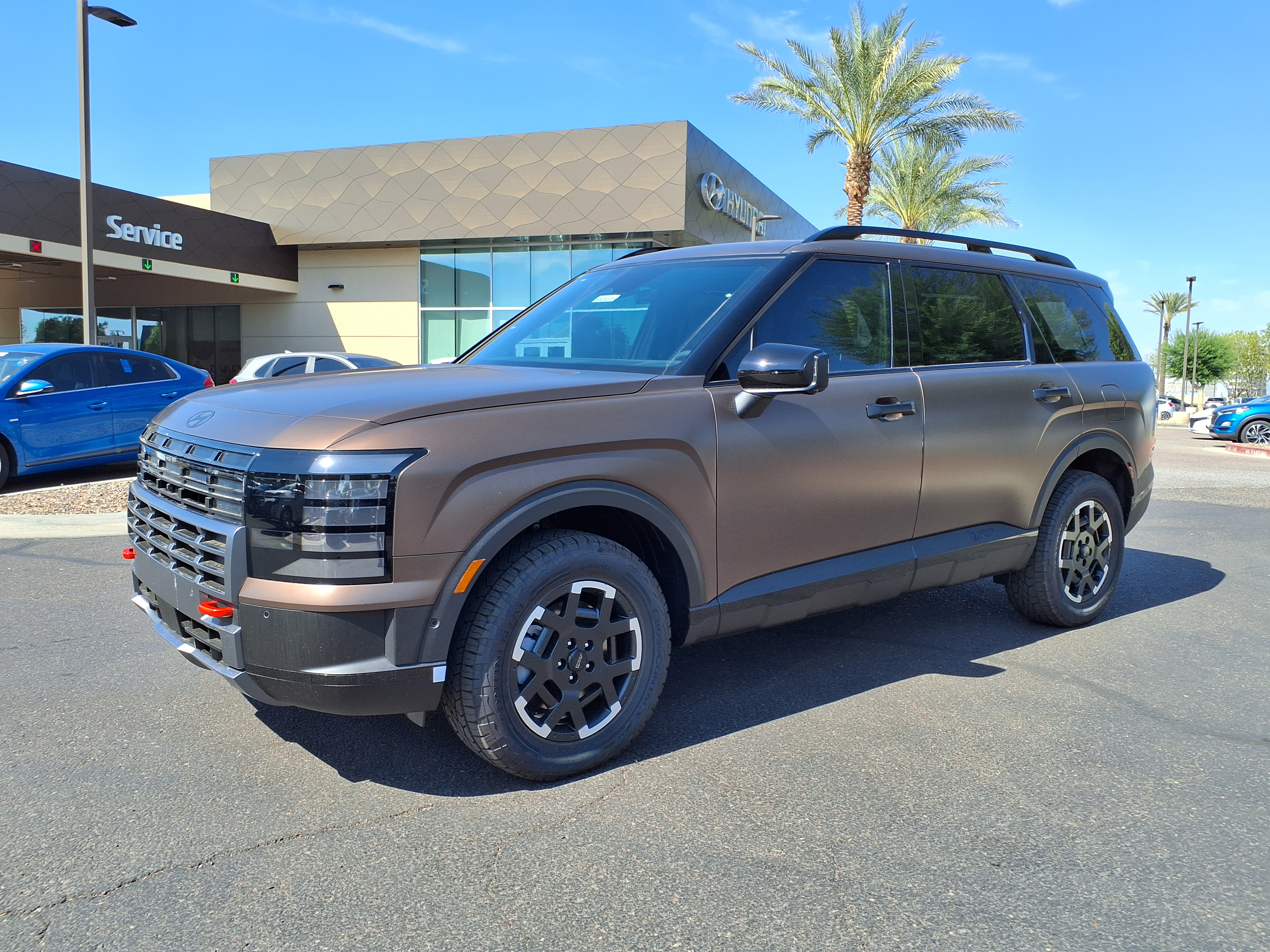
Palisade XRT Pro

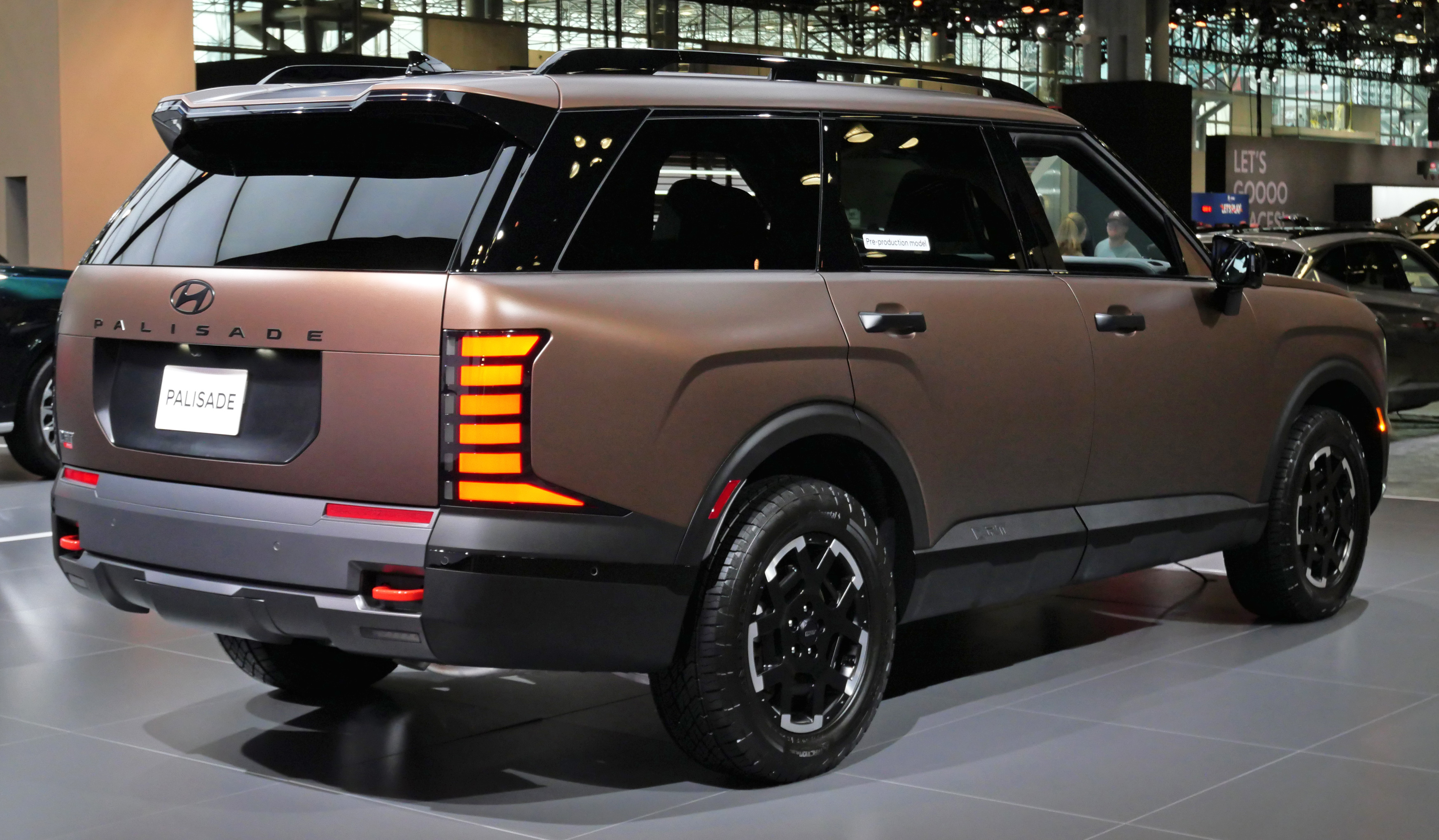
Rear view (XRT Pro)

=== Markets ===
==== Asia ====
===== Brunei =====
The second-generation Palisade was launched in Brunei on 12 December 2025, in the sole variant: Calligraphy AWD, powered by the Smartstream G 2.5-litre turbocharged petrol.

===== Indonesia =====
The second-generation Palisade was launched in Indonesia on 13 June 2025, with three variants: Signature, Calligraphy and Calligraphy AWD, powered by the Smartstream G 2.5-litre turbocharged petrol hybrid.

===== Laos =====
The second-generation Palisade was launched in Laos on 5 March 2026, with two variant: GLS AWD and Calligraphy AWD, powered by the Smartstream G 2.5-litre turbocharged petrol.

===== Philippines =====
The second-generation Palisade was launched in the Philippines on 23 July 2025, in the sole HEV Calligraphy variant, powered by the Smartstream G 2.5-litre turbocharged petrol hybrid.

====== South Korea ======
In South Korea, pre-orders for the second-generation Palisade opened on 20 December 2024, and deliveries began in January 2025. About 45,000 orders were placed during the pre-order month, of which around 70% were for the hybrid model and about 40% for the nine-seat configuration.

==== Middle East ====
The second-generation Palisade was launched in Saudi Arabia on 10 September 2025, offered through the local distributor in GL, GLS and Calligraphy trims, and reached the United Arab Emirates, through the exclusive distributor Juma Al Majid, in late 2025.

==== North America ====
The 2026 Palisade was revealed for the North American market during the New York International Auto Show on 16 April 2025. Powertrain options for the North American market include a 3.5-litre V6, the same Smartstream G3.5 as the fourth-generation Kia Carnival, paired to an 8-speed automatic transmission, and an all-new hybrid powertrain containing a 2.5-litre turbocharged inline-4 paired with electric motors and a 6-speed automatic transmission. The V6 powertrain can tow 5,000 pounds and the hybrid powertrain can tow 4,000 pounds.

Additionally, a new XRT Pro trim was revealed, promising improved off-road capability over the previous XRT trim. Specs include 8.4 inches of ground clearance, a 20.5-degree approach angle, a 22.4-degree departure angle, and an 18.3-degree breakover angle, and front and rear recovery hooks.

==== Oceania ====
===== Australia =====
The second-generation Palisade went on sale in Australia on 30 September 2025, in the sole Calligraphy trim powered by the Smartstream G 2.5-litre turbocharged petrol hybrid. In Australia, the Calligraphy trim is available with 7- and 8-seater configurations. The 7-seater configuration features electrically adjustable individual second-row seats and also includes the reclining relaxation mode. In February 2026, the Elite trim powered by the Smartstream G 2.5-litre turbocharged petrol hybrid, only available with the 8-seater configuration, was added to the line-up. In July 2026, the Calligraphy Black Ink model was made available with 7- and 8-seater configurations. In August 2026, the XRT Pro model using the Smartstream G 2.5-litre turbocharged petrol was introduced in Australia as the first factory-built XRT model sold in the Australian market, unlike the Santa Fe and Tucson which were only available with XRT-branded accessories.

=== Powertrain ===
Specs
Model	Year	Transmission	Power	Torque	0–100 km/h (0-62 mph) (Official)	Top speed
Petrol
Smartstream G2.5 T-GDi	2024–present	8-speed automatic	281 PS (207 kW; 277 hp) @ 5,800 rpm	43 kg⋅m (422 N⋅m; 311 lbf⋅ft) @ 1,700–4,000 rpm		
Smartstream G3.5 GDi	2025–present	8-speed automatic	291 PS (214 kW; 287 hp) @ 6,400 rpm	36 kg⋅m (353 N⋅m; 260 lbf⋅ft) @ 5,000 rpm		
Hybrid
Smartstream G2.5 T-GDi Hybrid	2025–present	6-speed automatic	334 PS (246 kW; 329 hp) @ 5,800 rpm	46.9 kg⋅m (460 N⋅m; 339 lbf⋅ft)		

=== Safety ===
ANCAP test results Hyundai Palisade all variants (2025, aligned with Euro NCAP)
Test	Points	%
Overall:	5 /5 stars	
Adult occupant:	33.90	84%
Child occupant:	42.57	86%
Pedestrian:	44.97	71%
Safety assist:	13.27	73%

IIHS scores— 2026 Hyundai Palisade 4-door SUV (North American model)
Small overlap front	Good
Moderate overlap front (updated test)	Good
Side (updated test)	Good
Headlights	Good
Front crash prevention: vehicle-to-vehicle(standard)	Good
Front crash prevention: pedestrian (standard)	Good
Seat belt reminders	Good
Child seat anchors (LATCH) ease of use	Good+

In the United States, the 2026 Palisade was named a 2026 IIHS Top Safety Pick+, the Insurance Institute for Highway Safety's highest award. The award applies only to vehicles built after November 2025, when Hyundai revised the rear seat-belt buckles, which raised the moderate overlap front rating from acceptable to good.

== Recall ==
In March 2026, Hyundai issued a stop-sale and recall covering about 69,000 model-year 2026 Palisade and Palisade Hybrid vehicles in the Limited and Calligraphy trims in the United States and Canada, after the second- and third-row power-folding seats were found to inadequately detect an occupant or object; the action followed the death of a young child in the United States, and Hyundai also reported related injuries. South Korea's transport ministry separately ordered a recall of about 58,000 Palisade hybrids, and the related Kia Telluride was affected by the same issue. The defect was remedied through an over-the-air software update that improves occupant and object detection, disables seat folding from the touchscreen, and requires the tailgate to be open and the physical switches to be pressed and held to fold the seats. Once the update had been applied, the stop-sale was lifted and sales resumed in April 2026.

== Sales ==
Year	U.S.	Canada	South Korea	Australia	Indonesia	China	Global sales
2019	28,736	3,845	52,299				107,514
2020	82,661	7,279	64,791				157,133
2021	86,539	6,739	52,338	3,720	1,442		157,688
2022	82,688	6,324	49,737	4,000	1,648		151,427
2023	89,509	7,173	41,093	3,770	2,794	640	166,061
2024	110,055	7,910	20,967	3,062	1,894	311	165,745
2025	123,929	9,226	60,909	2,364	1,593	246	211,215

== See also ==
- List of Hyundai vehicles
