= Hyundai Grandeur =

Full-size car

Hyundai Grandeur/Azera
- Seventh generation Grandeur (GN7)

Overview
- Manufacturer: Hyundai
- Also called: Hyundai Azera (2005–present); Mitsubishi Debonair (1986–1998)
- Production: 1986–present

Body and chassis
- Class: Full-size car (E)
- Body style: 4-door sedan
- Layout: Front-engine, front-wheel-drive (1986–present); Front-engine, all-wheel-drive (2022–present)

Chronology
- Predecessor: Hyundai Granada

The Hyundai Grandeur (Korean: 현대 그랜저), is an executive car / full-size car manufactured and marketed by the South Korean manufacturer Hyundai since 1986, over seven generations.

The Grandeur is Hyundai's flagship mainstream sedan, positioned below the Hyundai Dynasty, a more premium equivalent introduced in 1996 and the Equus, a flagship luxury sedan introduced in 1999, and it was also known as the Hyundai Azera in other markets such as North America and Middle East.

Since 2017, the Azera is no longer marketed in North America, specifically both the United States and Canada, as it was overshadowed by the Genesis G80, and it continues to be available in both South Korea and Middle East.

== First generation (YFL; 1986) ==
First generation
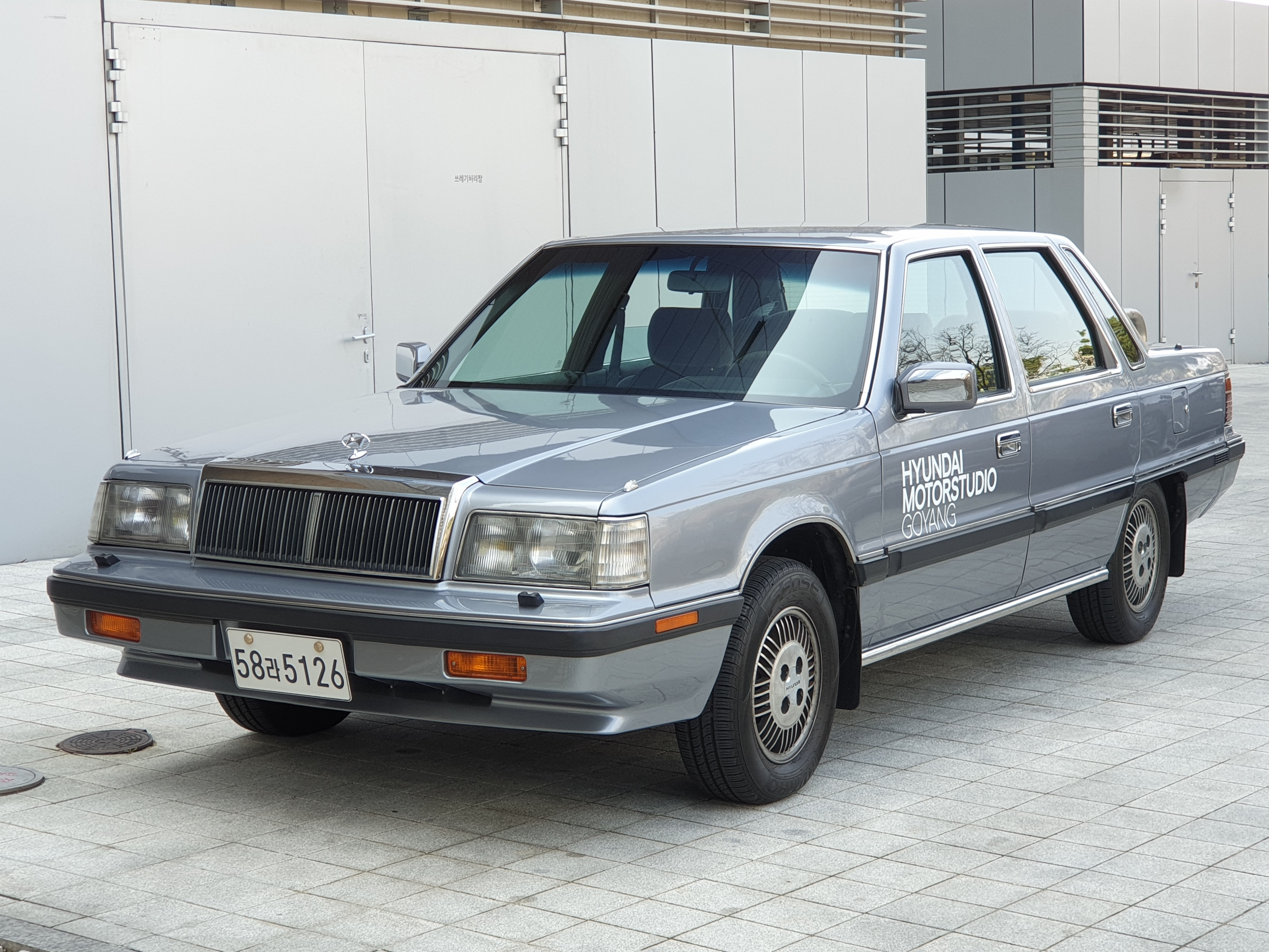

Overview
- Model code: L
- Also called: Mitsubishi Debonair
- Production: 1986–1992
- Assembly: South Korea: Ulsan

Powertrain
- Engine: 2.0 L Sirius SOHC I4; 2.4 L Sirius SOHC I4; 3.0 L Sigma SOHC V6
- Transmission: 5-speed manual 4-speed automatic

Dimensions
- Wheelbase: 2,735 mm (107.7 in)
- Length: 4,865 mm (191.5 in)
- Width: 1,725 mm (67.9 in)
- Height: 1,430 mm (56.3 in); 1,450 mm (57.1 in)
- Curb weight: 1,409–1,540 kg (3,106–3,395 lb)

The first Grandeur was a rebadged Mitsubishi Debonair produced by Hyundai. Initially launched with Mitsubishi-sourced 2.0L SOHC MPI version of the engine used in the first generation Sonata, a 2.4 L SOHC MPI engine was added in 1987. A V6 3.0 L engined model was launched in 1991 to better compete with the Daewoo Imperial.

=== Background ===
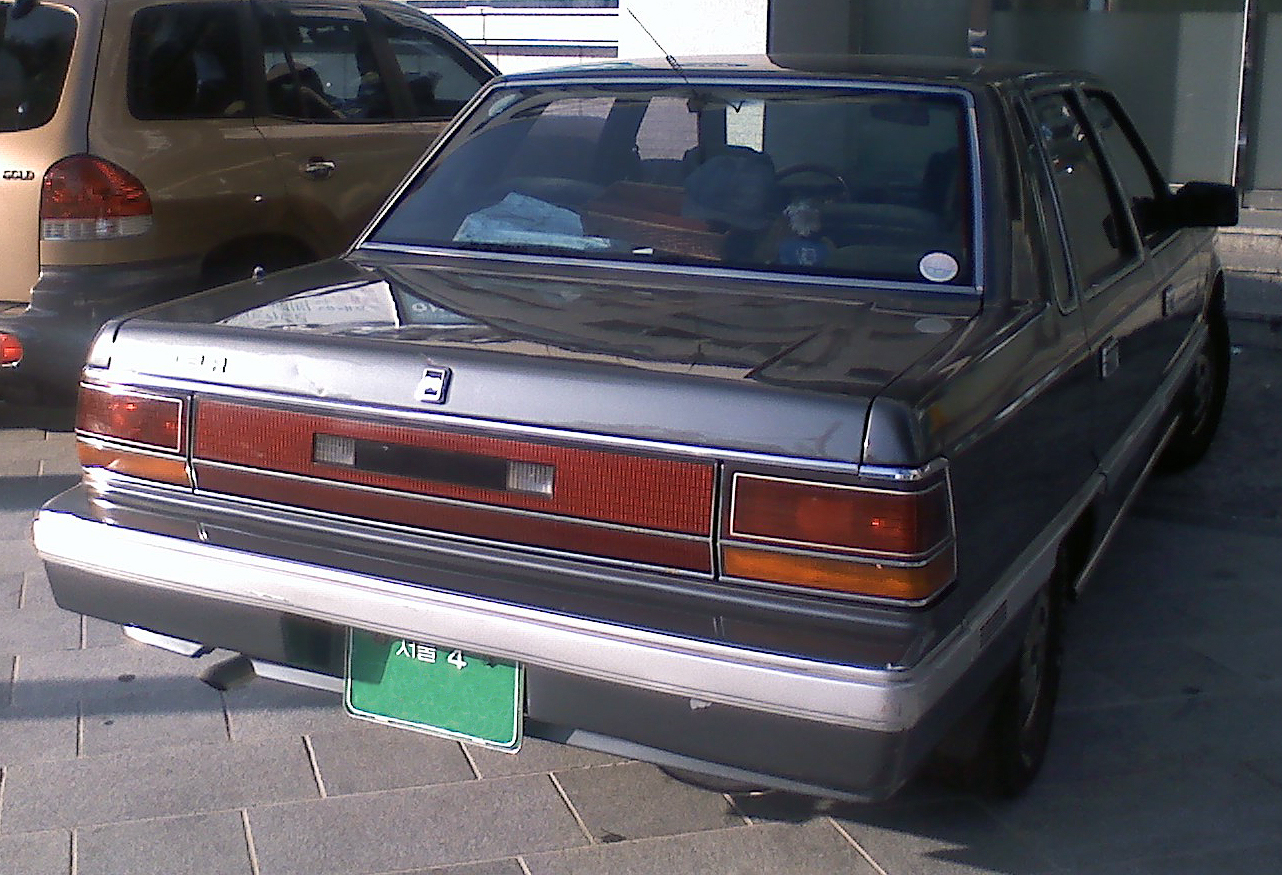
1986–1989 Grandeur, rear view

Before the 1988 Seoul Olympics, much of South Korea's luxury car market was dominated by Daewoo Motors and its Royale series. Beginning in October 1978, Hyundai's flagship offering in South Korea was the locally produced Ford Granada Mark II. However, The Daewoo Royale outsold the Granada in the marketplace, and Hyundai attempted to enter the luxury car market with its own design. Facing strong competition from Daewoo Motors' established brand presence, Hyundai abandoned this attempt and instead obtained the platform, technology, and internal configuration from Mitsubishi Motors to create the first-generation Hyundai Grandeur.

In the early eighties, Mitsubishi Motors was also seeking to replace its aging Debonair model, which had not undergone a major redesign since its debut in 1964. Given the existing relationship of sharing technologies and innovations, Mitsubishi accepted Hyundai's request to share a platform, internal configuration, and most importantly, an engine. As an official sponsor of 1988 Seoul Olympics, Hyundai used the event to showcase the Grandeur to executives, dignitaries, and other VIPs. Owing to its Mitsubishi-derived engineering and perceived quality, it became very popular in Korea.

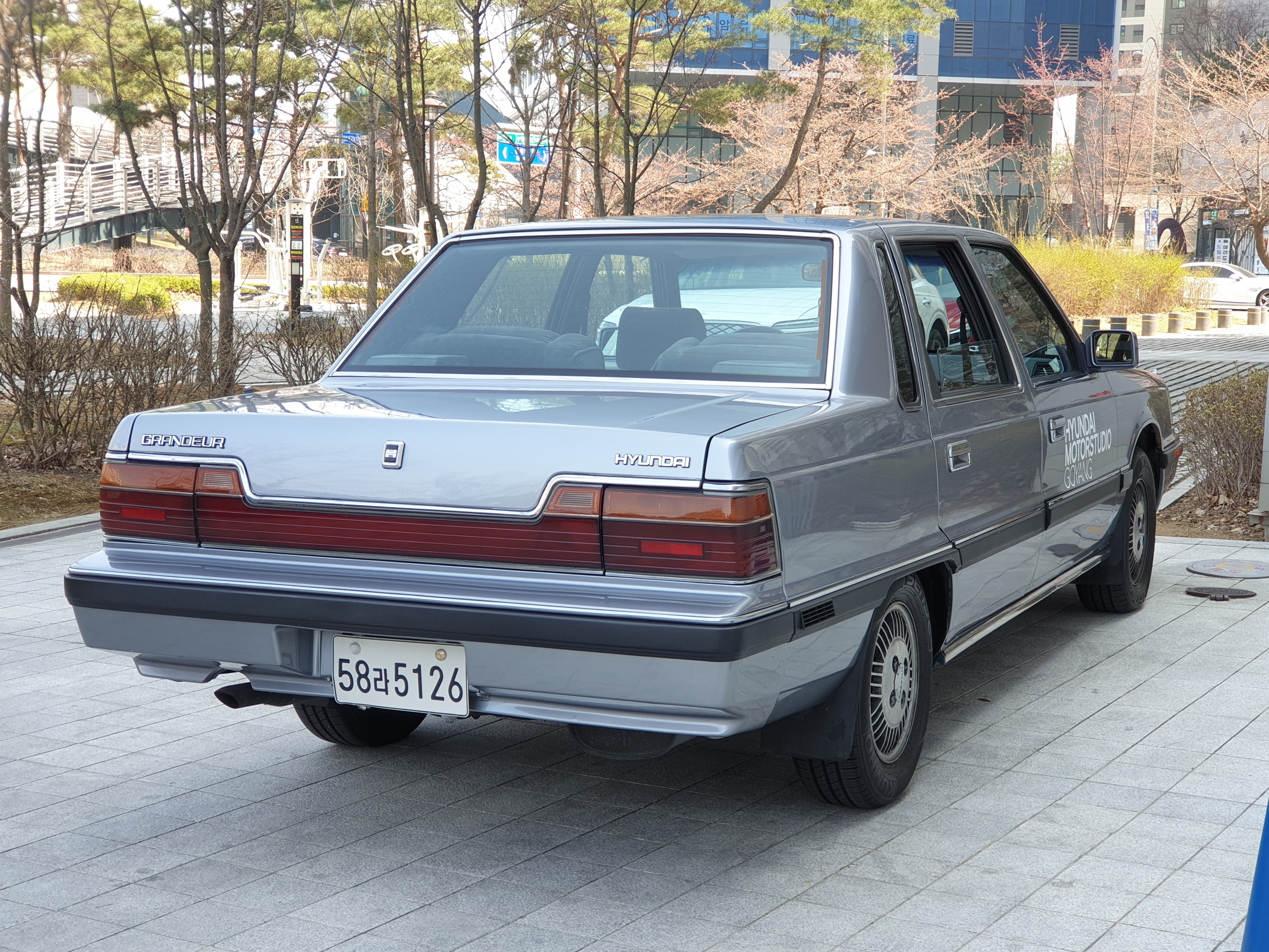
1989–1992 Grandeur, rear view

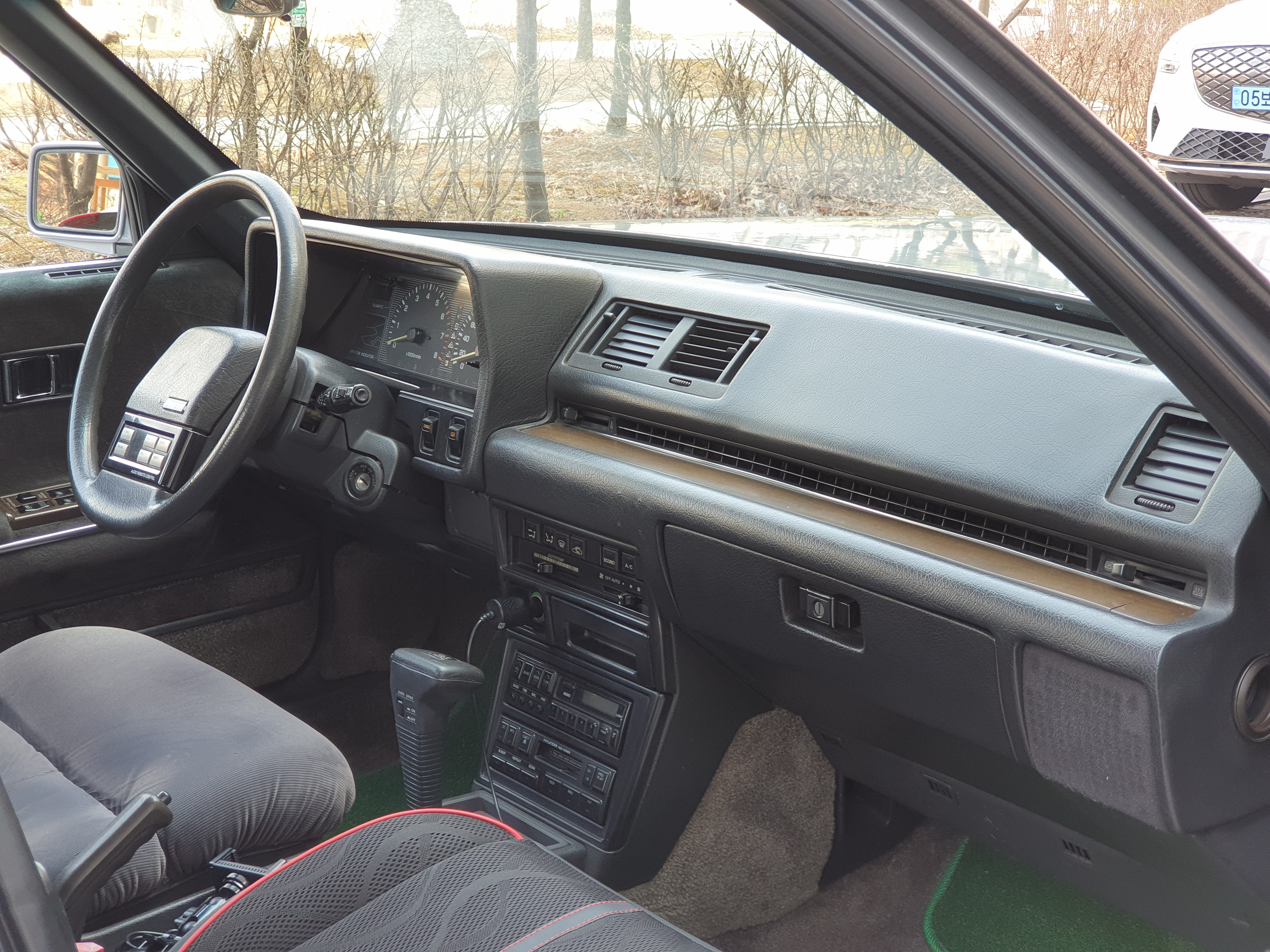
1989–1992 Grandeur, interior

Also called "Gak (angular)-Grandeur", it succeeded the Hyundai-built Granada. Official Olympic sponsor Hyundai Motor co-developed the Grandeur with Mitsubishi Motors of Japan, and launched it in July 1986, well in advance of the 1988 Summer Olympics. The design was done by Hyundai Motors, and the internal configuration was done by Mitsubishi. It was the second FF layout model in Korea after Hyundai Excel. Originally, only a four-cylinder 2,000 cc engine and manual transmission were offered, but later a 2,400 cc engine, a 3,000 cc V6 engine, and automatic transmission became available. The Grandeur became Korea's best-selling large car by a considerable margin. It was also sold in Japan as the Mitsubishi Debonair V, but the demanding class was already absorbed by the Toyota Crown, Nissan Cedric/Gloria, Mazda Luce, and Honda Legend, and the Debonair was not competitive in its home market.

The Grandeur's taillight design was changed in 1989, and ABS first became available in 1991. It had 4-speed automatic transmission or 5-speed manual transmission. It was discontinued in September 1992, after 122,074 had been built.

=== Grandeur EV ===
Hyundai restomodded an example of the first generation Grandeur as an EV concept version called 'Hyundai Grandeur Heritage', using the "Parametric Pixel" design language from the Ioniq line. It celebrates the 35th anniversary of the Grandeur, and debuted at Hyundai Motorstudio Goyang on November 12, 2021. It is the second Heritage Series restomod EV after the Pony EV, and will be followed by the Galloper EV.

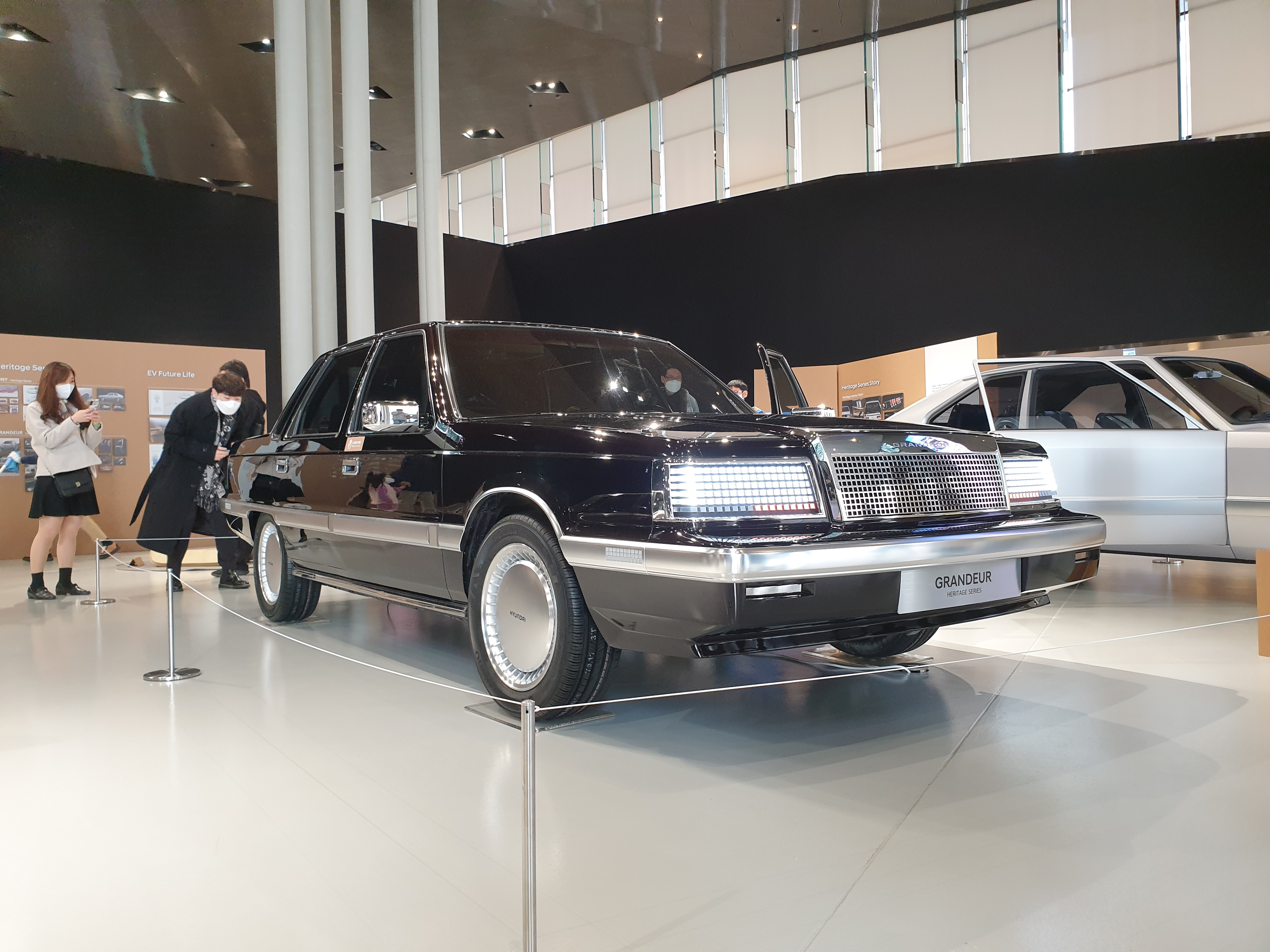
Front View

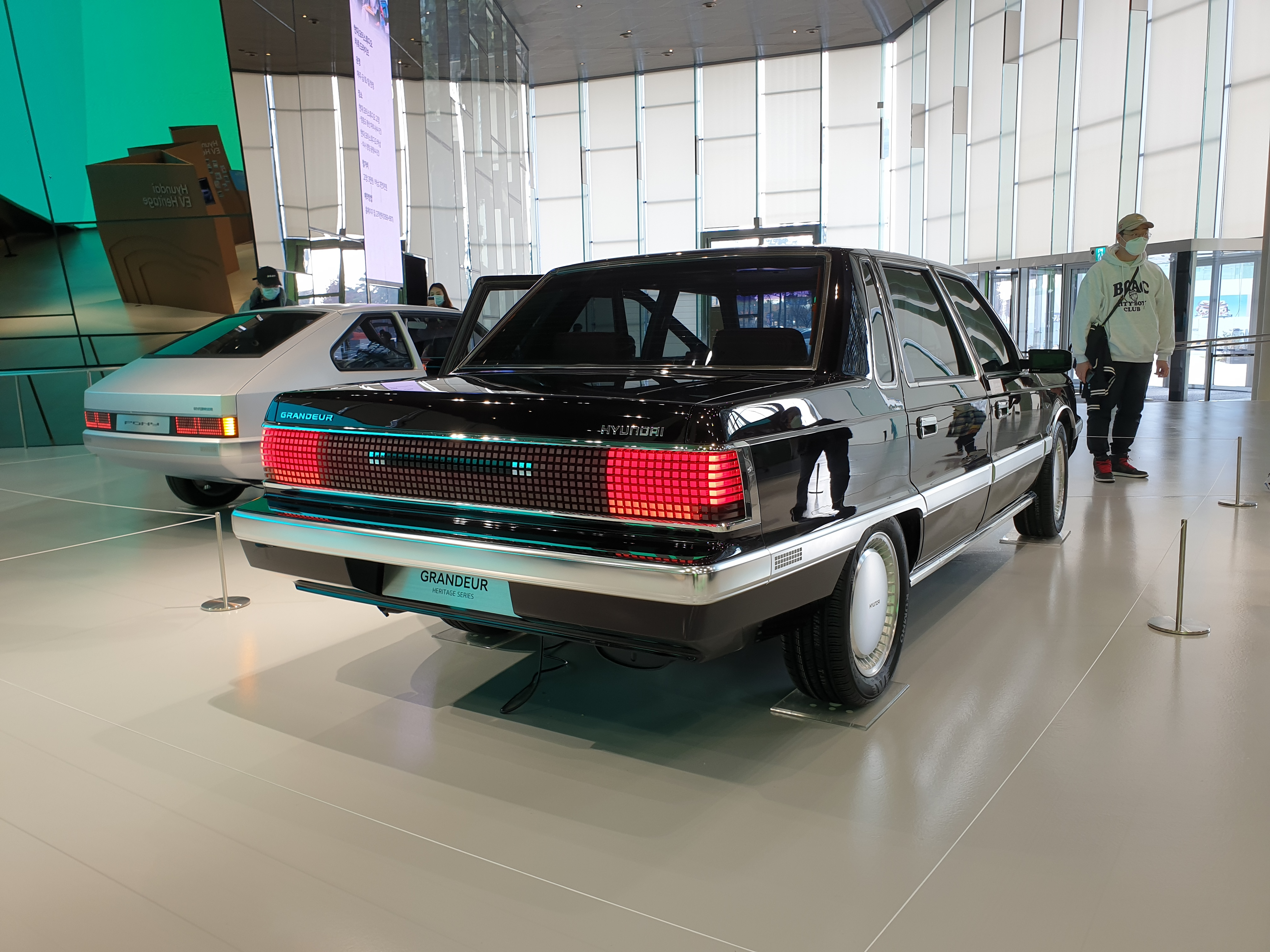
Rear View

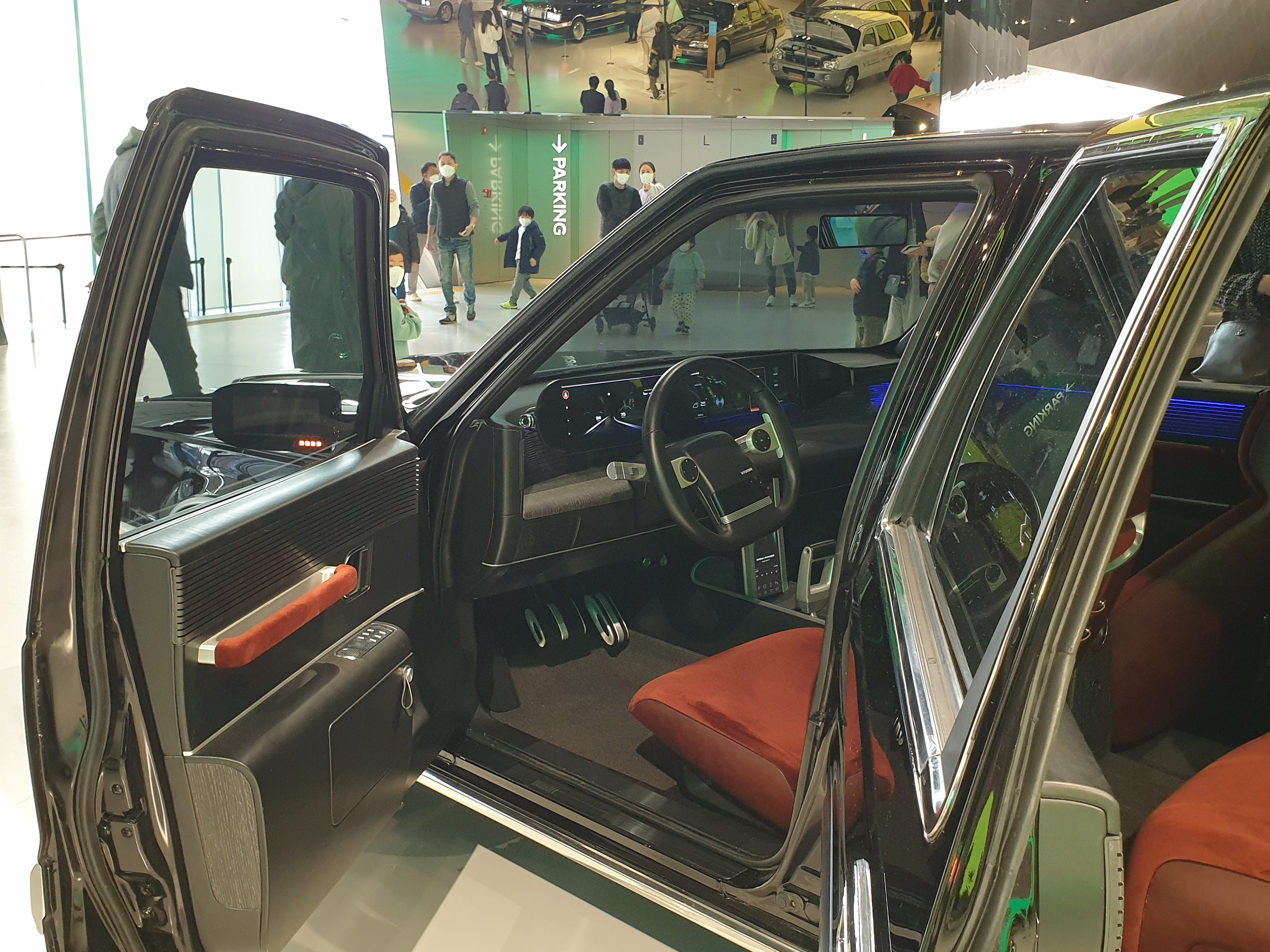
Interior

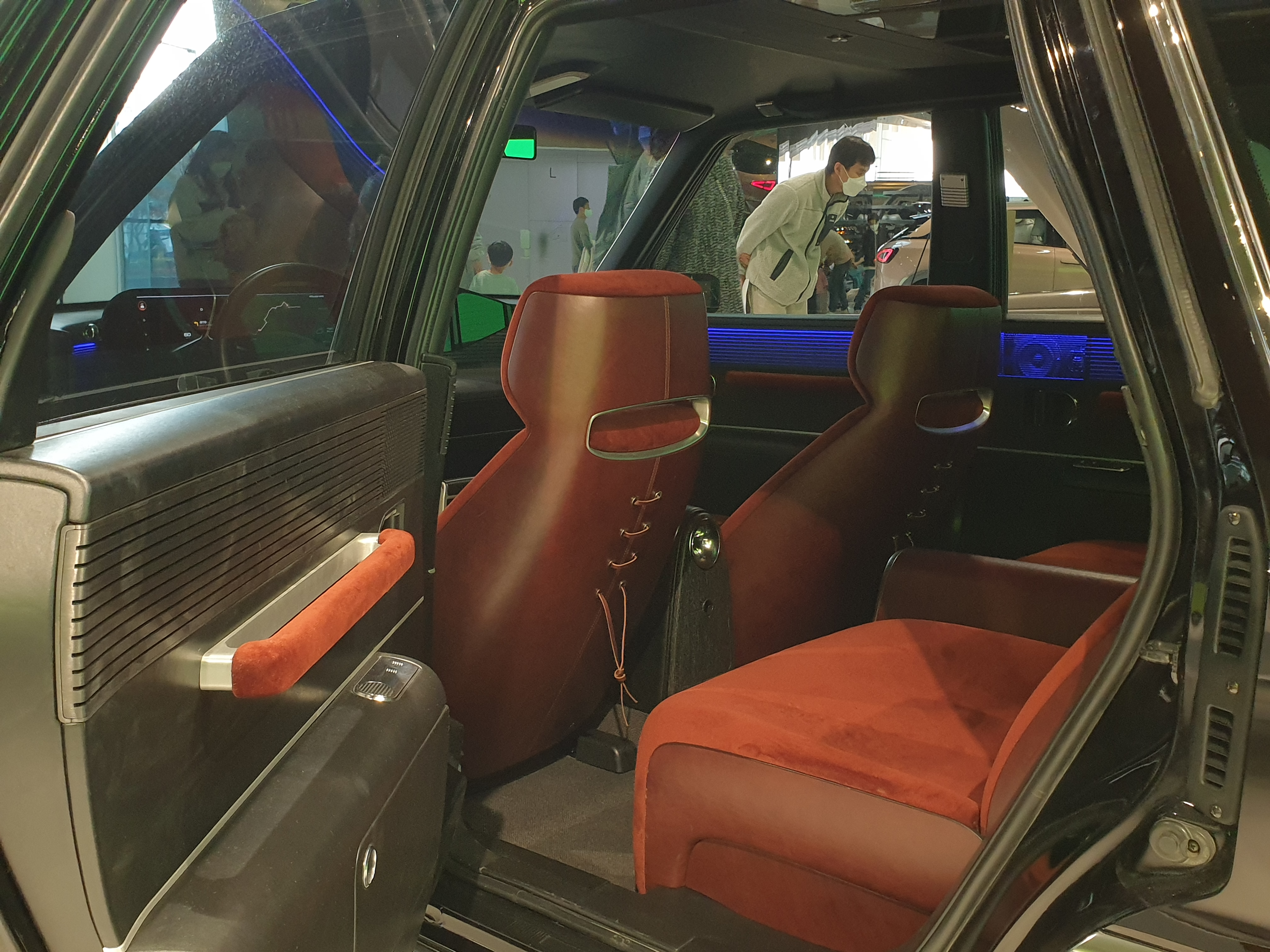
Interior

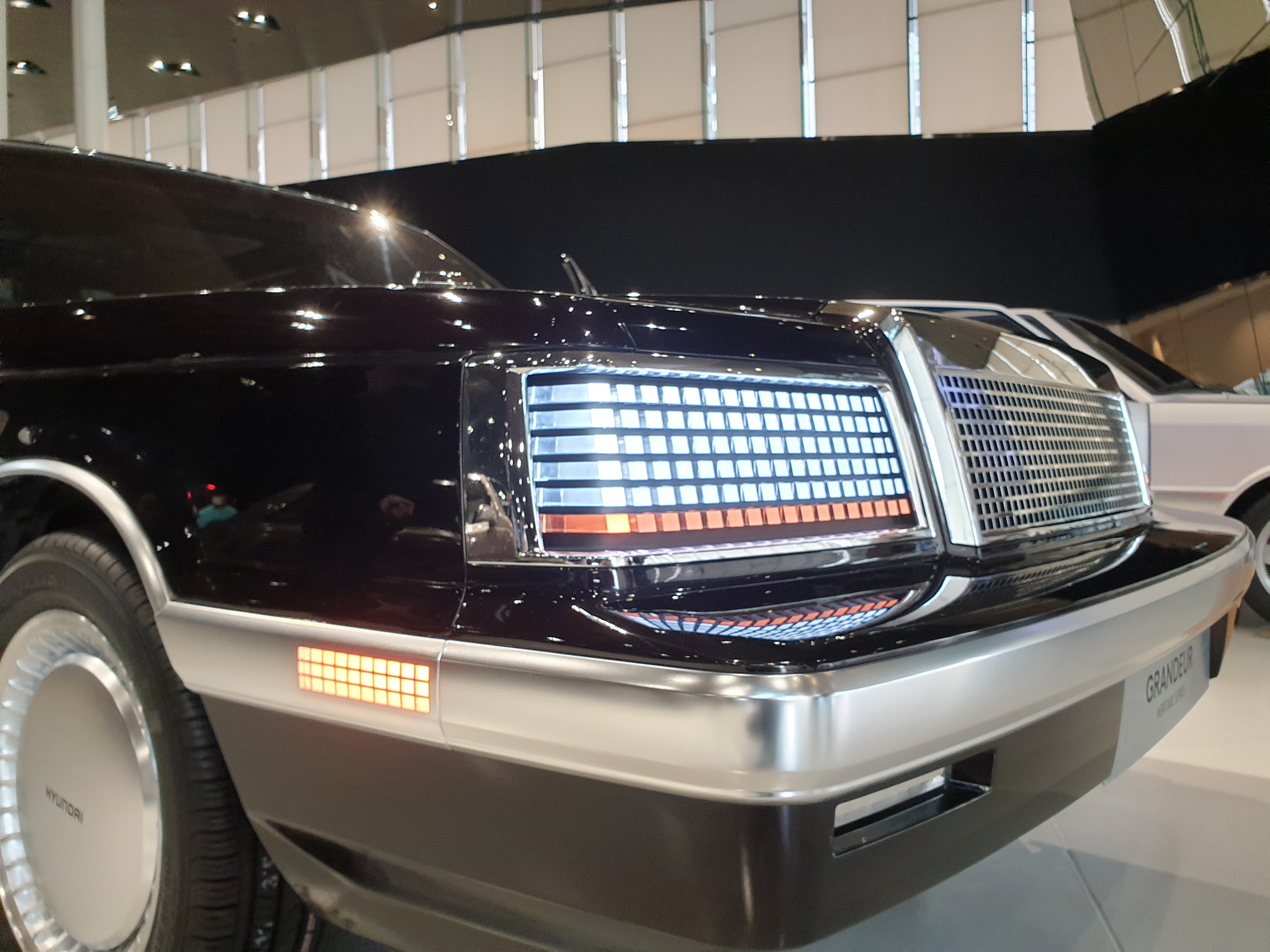
"Parametric Pixel" headlight detail

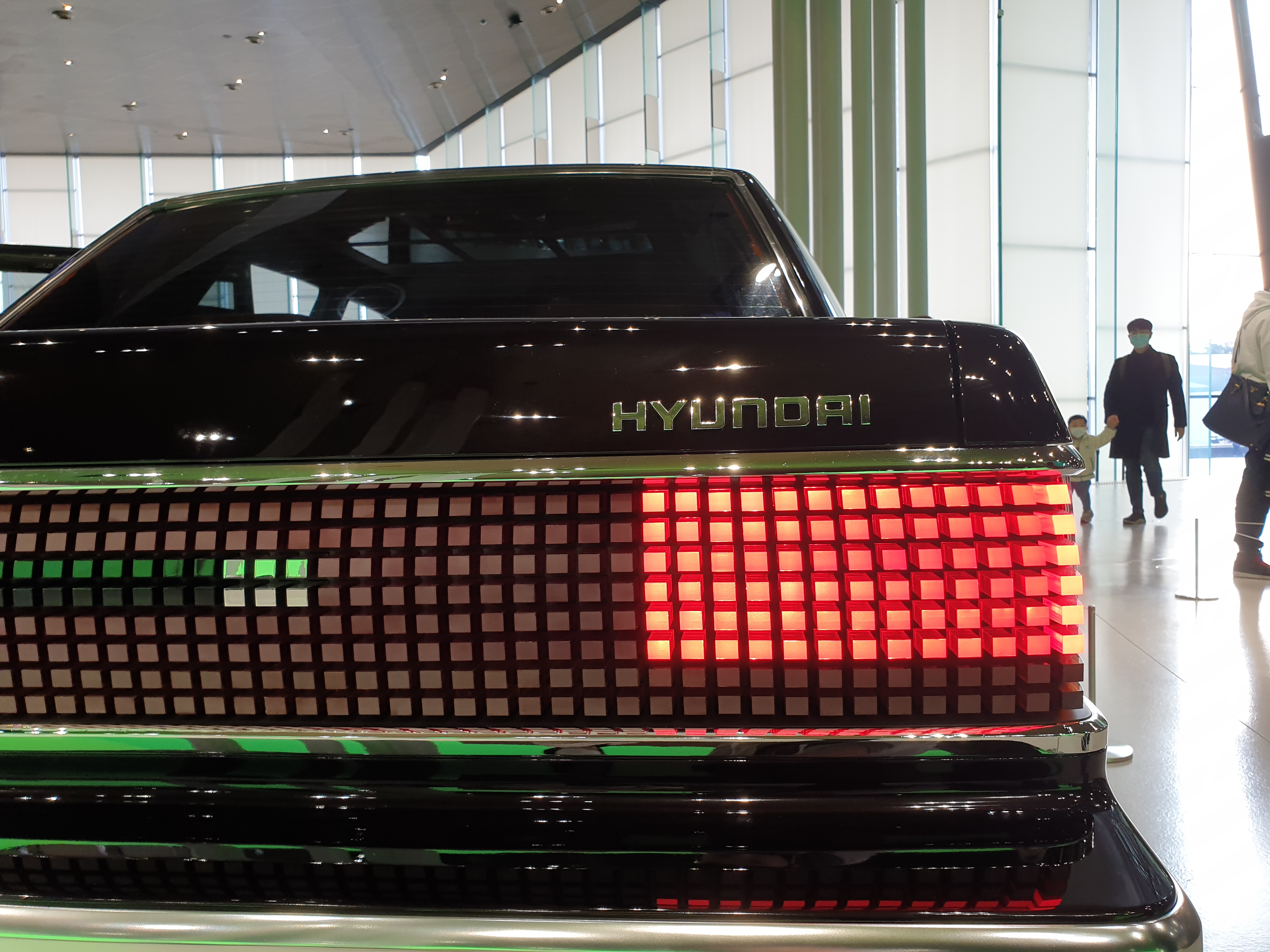
Taillight detail

== Second generation (LX; 1992) ==
Second generation
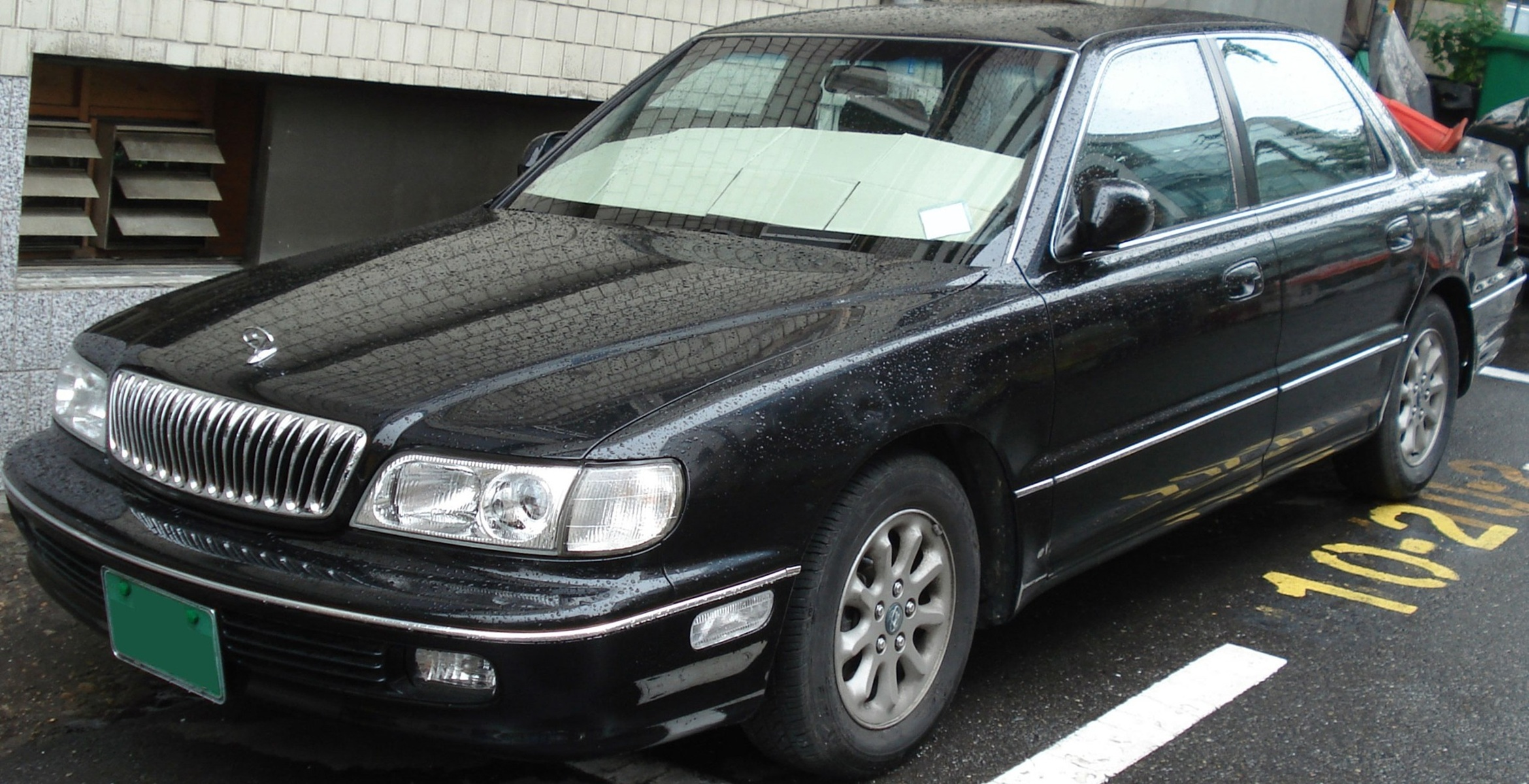

Overview
- Model code: LX
- Also called: Mitsubishi Debonair
- Production: 1992–1998
- Assembly: South Korea: Ulsan

Body and chassis
- Related: Mitsubishi Debonair; Hyundai Dynasty

Powertrain
- Engine: 2.0 L Sirius II DOHC I4; 2.4 L Sirius SOHC I4; 2.5 L Sigma DOHC V6; 3.0 L Sigma SOHC/DOHC V6; 3.5 L Sigma DOHC V6
- Transmission: 5-speed manual 4-speed automatic

Dimensions
- Wheelbase: 2,745 mm (108.1 in)
- Length: 4,980 mm (196.1 in)
- Width: 1,810 mm (71.3 in)
- Height: 1,435–1,445 mm (56.5–56.9 in)
- Curb weight: 1,540–1,730 kg (3,395–3,814 lb)

The New Grandeur and the third generation of the Mitsubishi Debonair were the products of a joint development between Hyundai and Mitsubishi Motors. Mitsubishi was responsible for the powertrain, and Hyundai was responsible for the body and trim design. Production of the car began in September 1992 and ended in 1998.

=== Powertrain ===
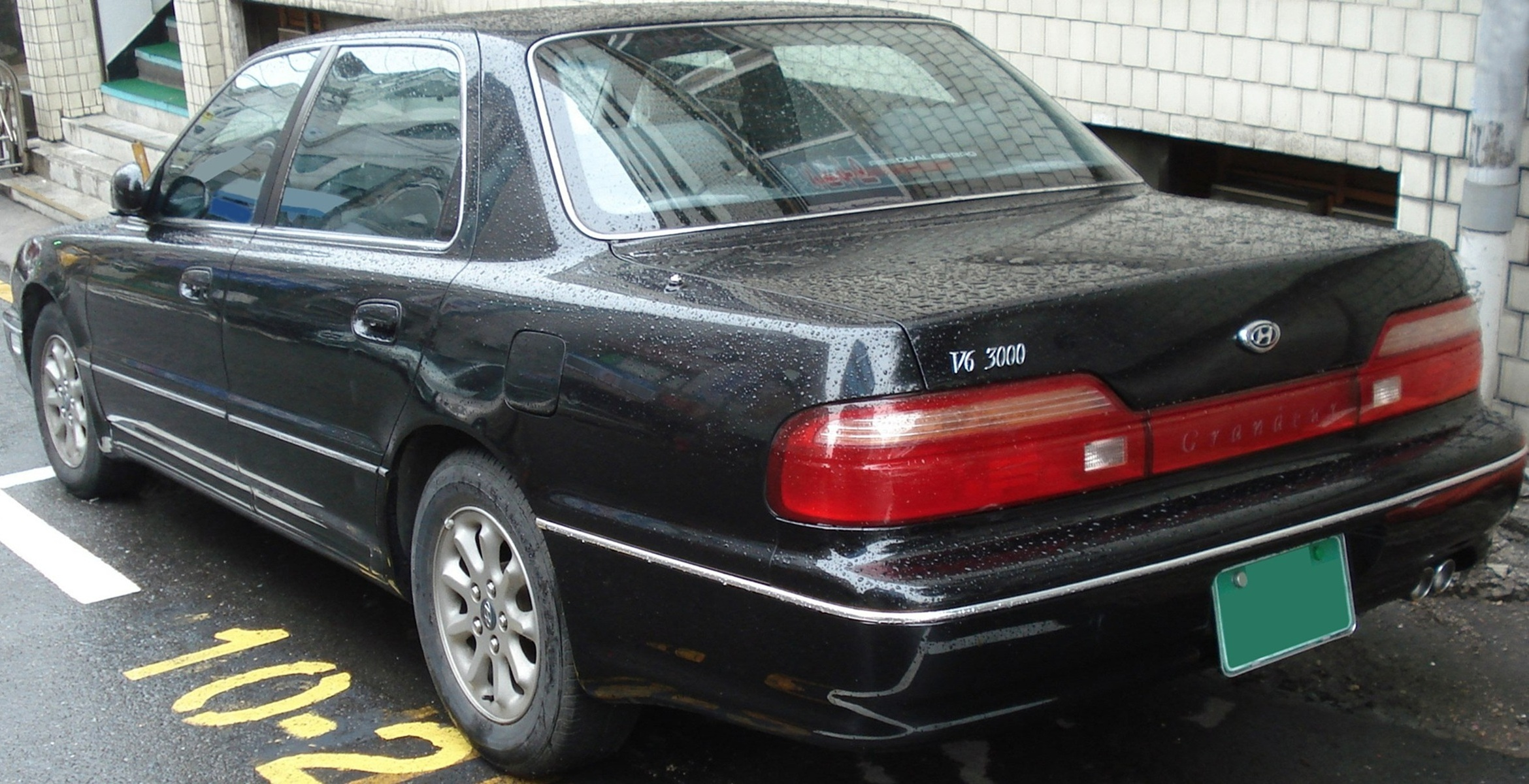
1997–1998 Hyundai Grandeur, rear view

The "New Grandeur" came in various trim levels and only V6 engine combinations (2.0L, 2.5L, 3.0L, and 3.5L). The new Grandeur became a huge success following the first generation Grandeur it replaced. However, the reception of the same model marketed by Mitsubishi in Japan was perfunctory eventually leading Mitsubishi to discontinue it earlier than expected.

The 3-litre and 3.5-litre engines developed by Mitsubishi were substantial legacies to Hyundai, which at the time did not have the ability to manufacture engines of that size on its own. Following the Debonair's discontinuation in Japan, the Hyundai-Mitsubishi partnership led to the production of the Hyundai Equus and Mitsubishi Dignity premium flagship sedans, and the slightly smaller Hyundai Dynasty and Mitsubishi Proudia. Since the production of Hyundai Equus, Hyundai develops all engines in its product line on its own, such as the industry-acclaimed 4.6-litre Tau Engine featured on the Hyundai Genesis.

=== Public reaction ===
Although it was not exported outside the home market, the second generation Grandeur was a success in the Korean domestic market as the flagship sedan of Hyundai lineup. This model became a status symbol in Korea, which many politicians and wealthy business executives have used.

== Third generation (XG; 1998) ==
Third generation
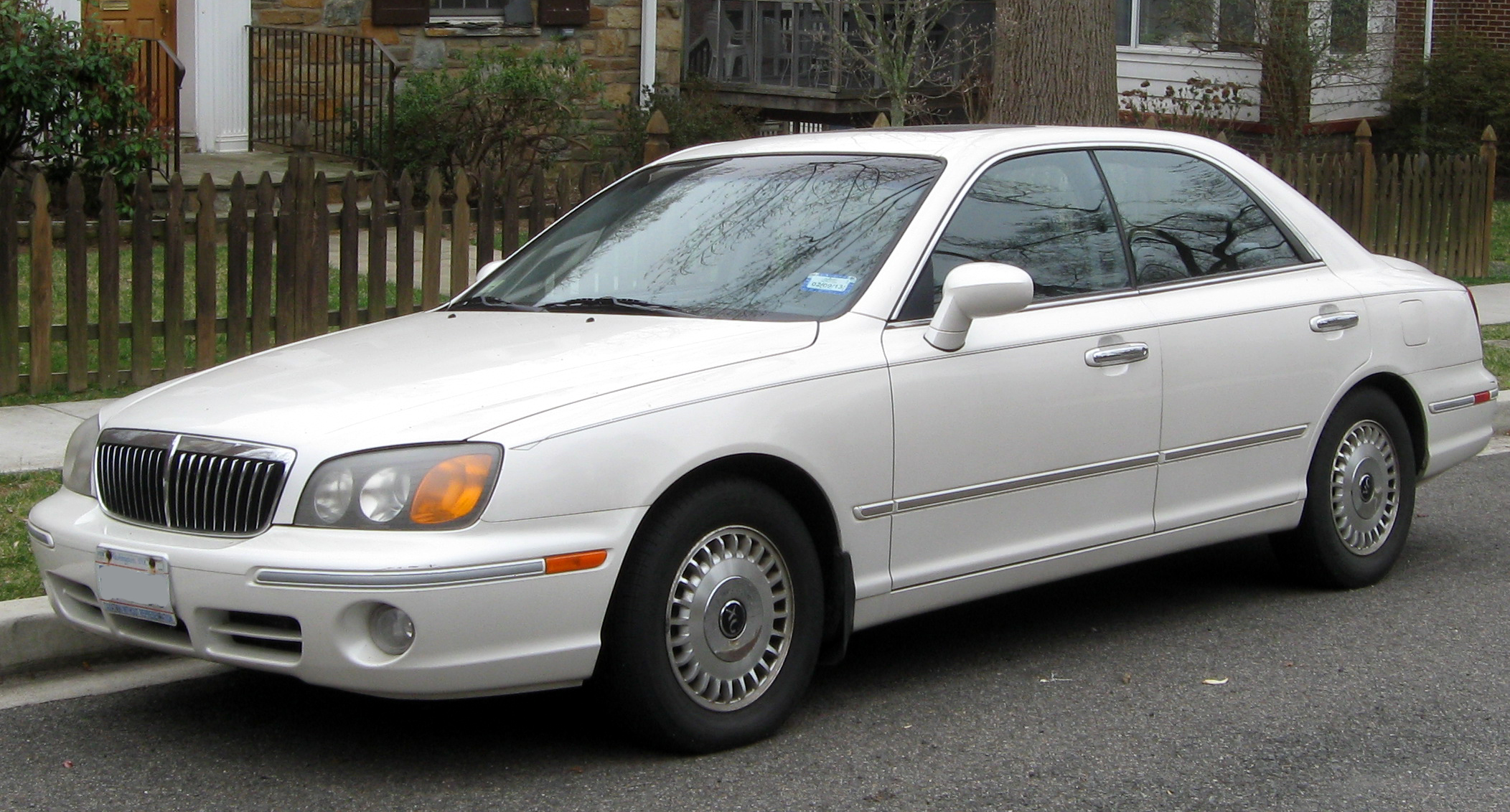

Overview
- Model code: XG
- Also called: Hyundai XG; Hyundai XG25; Hyundai XG30; Hyundai XG300; Hyundai XG350; Hyundai Grandeur XG (South Korea)
- Production: 1998–2005
- Model years: 2001 (XG300); 2002–2005 (XG350)
- Assembly: South Korea: Asan; Turkey: İzmit (Hyundai Assan); Taiwan: Taoyuan

Body and chassis
- Related: Kia Opirus/Amanti; Hyundai Dynasty; Hyundai Trajet

Powertrain
- Engine: 2.0 L Delta V6; 2.5 L Delta V6; 2.7 L Delta V6; 3.0 L Sigma V6; 3.5 L Sigma V6
- Transmission: 5-speed manual 4-speed automatic 5-speed automatic

Dimensions
- Wheelbase: 2,750 mm (108.3 in)
- Length: 4,865 mm (191.5 in) (1998–2002); 4,875 mm (191.9 in) (2002–2005)
- Width: 1,825 mm (71.9 in)
- Height: 1,420 mm (55.9 in)
- Curb weight: 1,425–1,729 kg (3,142–3,812 lb)

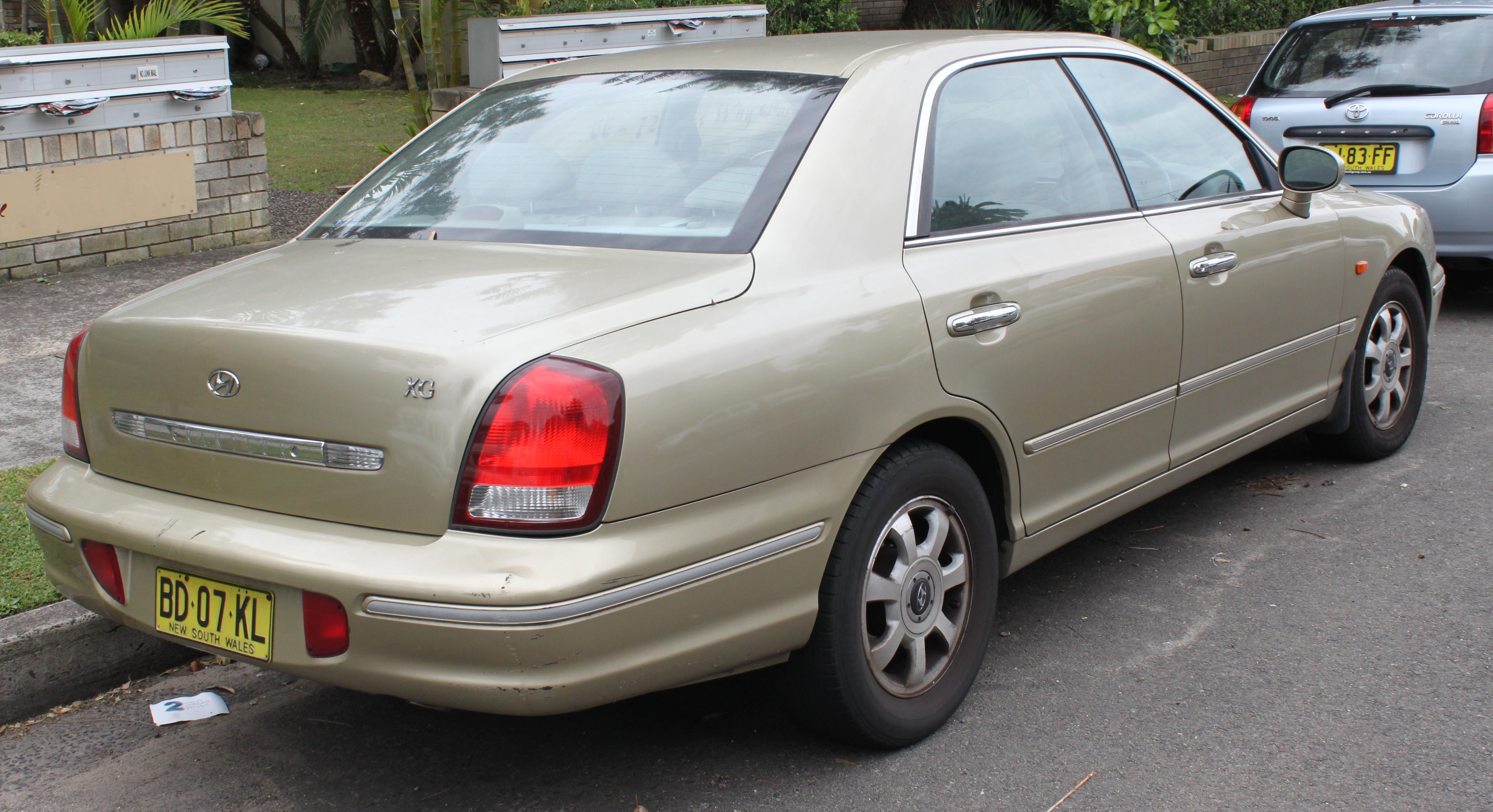
2002 Hyundai Grandeur (XG) XG sedan (Australia)

The third-generation Grandeur is marketed as the Grandeur XG, mirroring its internal development code. In North America and Japan, it was marketed as the Hyundai XG. The first two generations were essentially rebadged Mitsubishi Debonairs, with the third generation developed entirely by Hyundai, with technical experience learned from the first two generations. The Kia Opirus (Amanti in North America) shared a modified variant of the Grandeur/XG platform. After this generation, Hyundai developed the next generation on their own from the ground up with technology accumulated through past generations, enabling export of the XG outside South Korea without legal complications.

Leveraging its luxurious image, the XG moniker later was also applied to the domestic market Hyundai Trajet which uses the same platform with the Grandeur XG.

=== XG250 ===
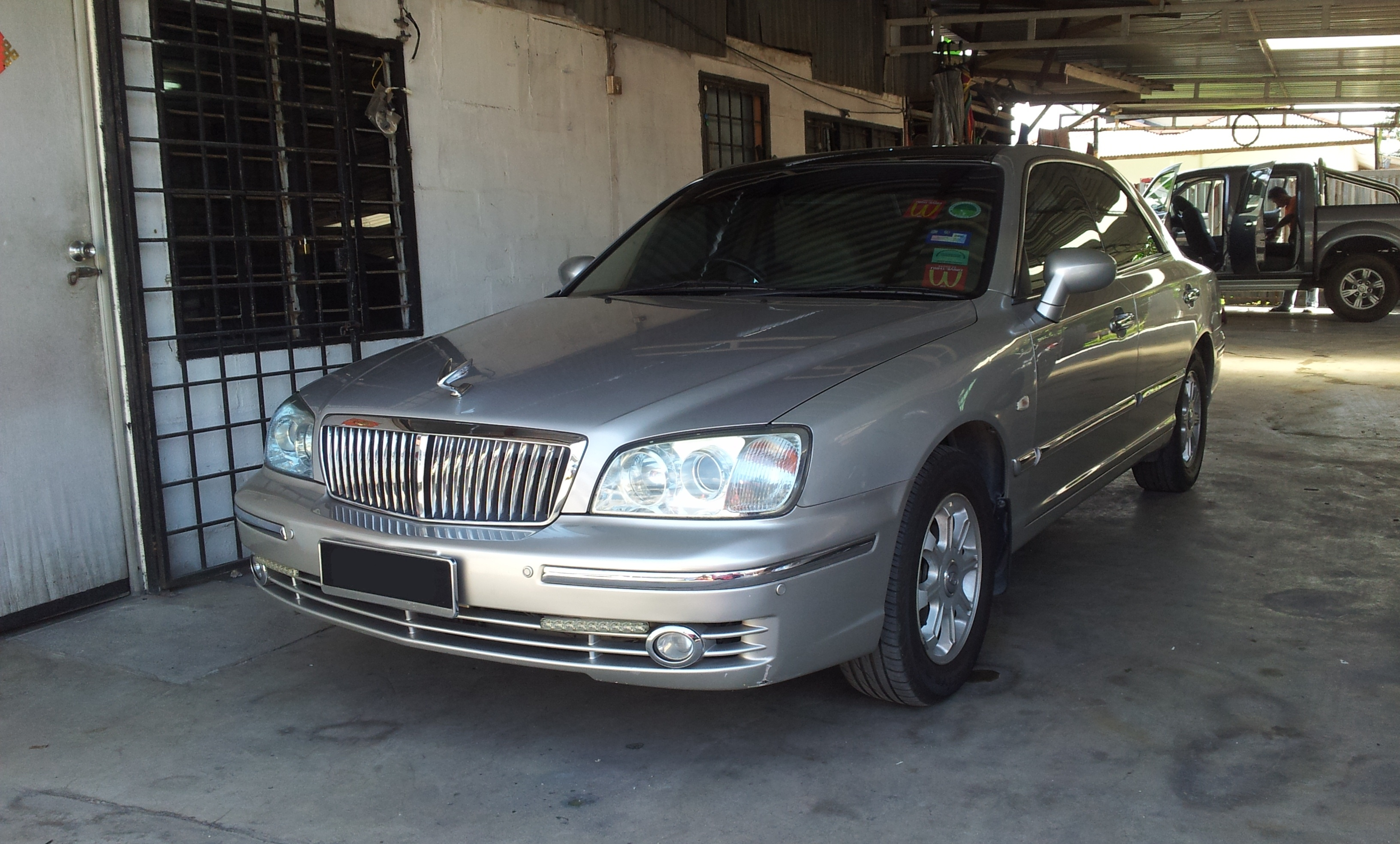
2003–2005 Hyundai Grandeur XG250 (Malaysia)

The XG250 debuted in 1999 with a 2.5 L Delta V6. It was also marketed as the XG25 in some markets and was produced until 2005. There was a two-litre model called the XG20 for some markets, including South Korea.

- Performance
  - Acceleration: 0–60 mph in 10.6 seconds
  - Top speed: 204 km/h (127 mph)
  - Power: 165 bhp (123 kW)

=== XG300 ===
The XG300 debuted in 1999 with a 3.0 L Sigma V6.

It was manufactured from 2001 to 2003 and marketed as the XG30 in Europe and in Asian countries. A 2.5-litre model, called XG25, was also marketed in some countries, including as France.

In the United States, the XG300 equipped with the 3.0-litre V6 engine was available for the 2001 model year only. The "L" model included heated front seats, rear seat reading lamps, two-position driver's side memory seat and outside mirrors, power moonroof, 6-speaker Infinity AM/FM/CD/cassette stereo system, wood-tone accented steering wheel, electrochromic rearview mirror with a built-in three-channel HomeLink-compatible garage door opener, and a parking aid feature that automatically tilted the dual exterior mirrors downward when the transmission is in reverse. Automatic electronic climate control was available option, along with a power moonroof on the base model, and a trunk-mounted eight-disc CD changer for the L model.

- Performance
  - Acceleration: 0–60 mph in 9.8 seconds
  - Top speed: 214 km/h (133 mph)
  - Power: 181 bhp (135 kW)

=== XG350 ===
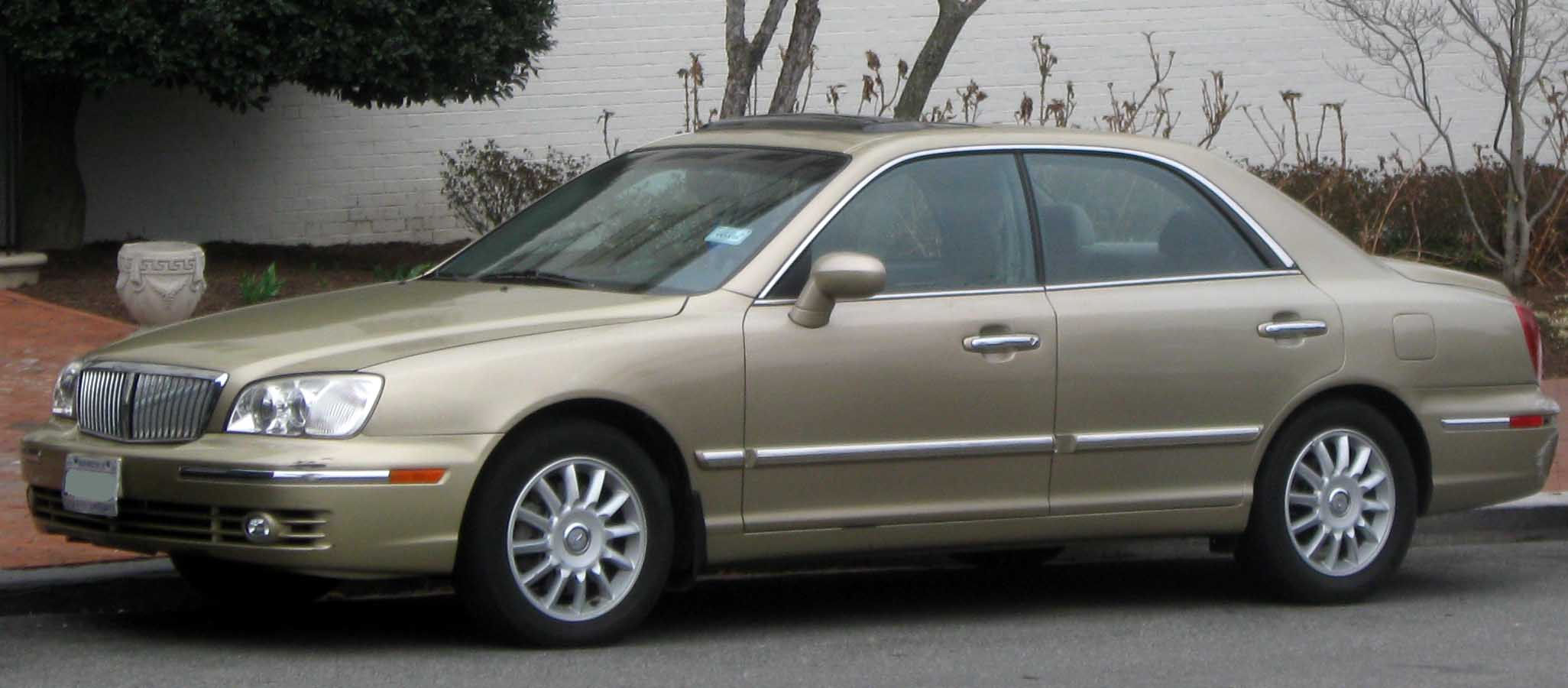
2004–2005 Hyundai XG350L (US)

The 2002 XG350 models were equipped with a larger 3.5-litre V6 Sigma 194 hp (145 kW) engine. While providing 2 hp (1.5 kW) more horsepower than the previous engine, it offered an additional 38 lb⋅ft (52 N⋅m) of torque, now rated at 216 lb⋅ft (293 N⋅m). 16-inch bright 10-spoke alloy wheels were an inch larger than for the 2001 model year. In the United States, the power moonroof was no longer an option on base models. 2003 brought a new instrument cluster, and updated graphics for the console trip computer.

In the 2004 model year, the XG350 received larger front brakes (discs went from 10.9- to 12-inch), which in turn required a 16-inch spare tire as standard equipment, replacing the 'space-saver' design used since 2001. Also new this year were restyled front and rear bumpers, bodyside moldings, headlights (now with HID availability), driving lights, tail lamps, grille, and deck lid with recessed license plate holder. The high-mounted stop lamp in the rear window went to an all-new LED design. The interior wood-tone trim changed to a lighter shade, glove compartment and storage bins were now covered in charcoal gray material (formerly black), the door-mounted power window switch panels now matched the interior color (previously, they were high-gloss wood-tone), recessed seat tethers allowed for secure installation of child seats in all three rear seat positions, and the trunk hinges were now supported using hydraulic pistons. Standard equipment leather upholstery was available in solid deep charcoal or a two-tone finish featuring a tan interior with brown dashboard/center console and upper door trim. The L versions were equipped with specific 12-spoke silver-painted alloy rims featuring center caps covering the lug nuts. Minor equipment changes inside included redesigned levers for the hood release and tilt steering column, an updated cruise control switch, a recessed trunk pull-down handle, and leather trim around the console armrest tray.

2005 was the last model year for the XG350, as it would be replaced at the top of the Hyundai line-up by the 2006 Azera. Both the base and L models now offered the formerly optional carpeted floor mats as standard equipment, while the L model was now equipped with a standard trunk-mounted eight-disc CD changer. The driver's door switch panel featured a restyled power door lock button; it was now designed to feel less like the adjacent power window controls, for ease of differentiation by touch.

2.0 and 2.5 Delta engines were available in South Korea.

== Fourth generation (TG; 2005) ==
Fourth generation
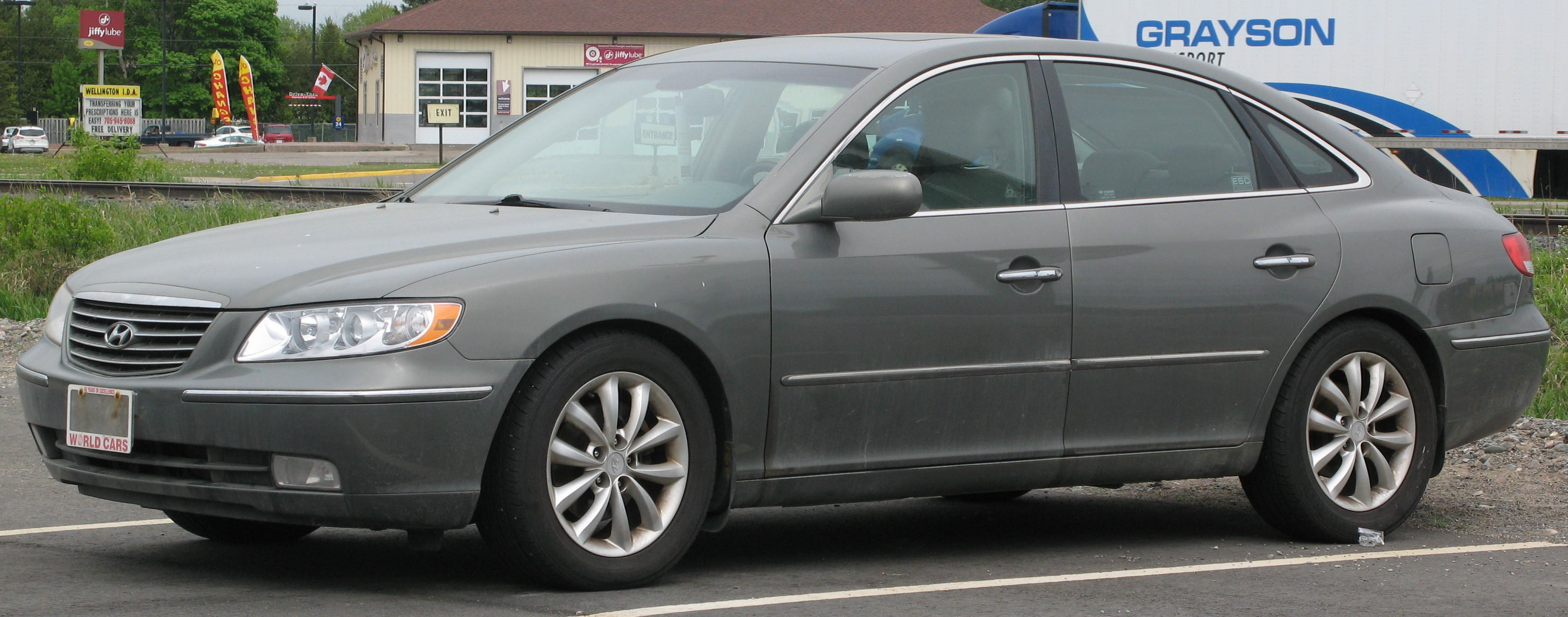

Overview
- Model code: TG
- Also called: Hyundai Azera
- Production: 2005–2011
- Model years: 2006–2011
- Assembly: South Korea: Asan

Body and chassis
- Body style: 4-door sedan
- Related: Hyundai Sonata; Hyundai Santa Fe; Hyundai Veracruz/ix55; Kia Optima/Magentis/Lotze; Kia Carens/Rondo; Kia Sorento

Powertrain
- Engine: petrol: 2.4 L Theta II I4; 2.7 L Mu V6; 3.3 L Lambda V6; 3.3 L Lambda II V6; 3.8 L Lambda V6; 3.8 L Lambda II V6; LPG: 2.7 L Mu LPi V6; diesel: 2.2 L D4EB CRDI VGT I4
- Transmission: 5-speed automatic 6-speed automatic

Dimensions
- Wheelbase: 2,780 mm (109.4 in)
- Length: 4,895–4,910 mm (192.7–193.3 in)
- Width: 1,850–1,865 mm (72.8–73.4 in)
- Height: 1,490–1,500 mm (58.7–59.1 in)
- Curb weight: 1,565–1,730 kg (3,450–3,814 lb)

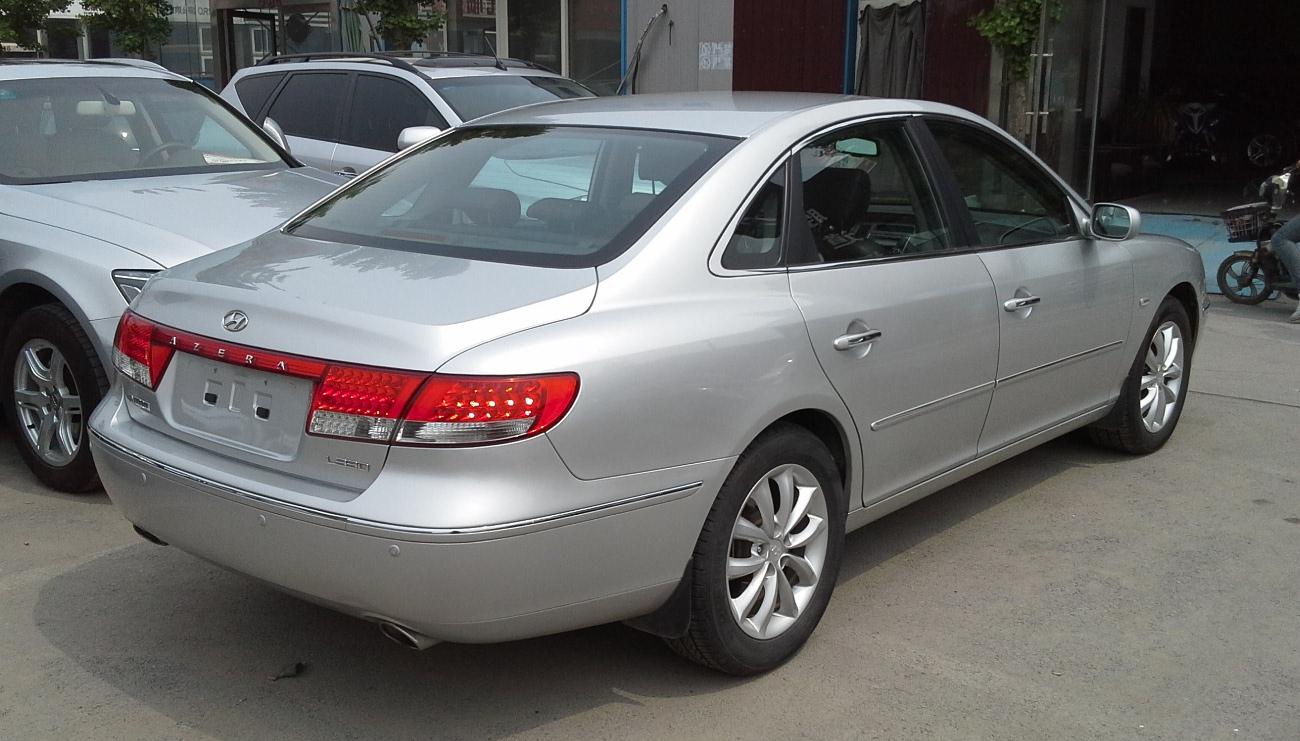
2009 Hyundai Azera (China)

The Grandeur TG is a mid-size sedan introduced for the 2006 model year. A redesigned XG350, it shares a platform with the Sonata. It is sold as the Hyundai Azera in North America, China, France, Taiwan, Philippines, Iran, Malaysia, The GCC (Persian Gulf states), South Africa, Singapore, Peru, Chile and Brazil. In Europe (except in France), Australia, New Zealand and Japan it was sold as the Grandeur. A few (approx 27) 3.3l Grandeurs were imported into the UK in around 2008/9 for use by Hyundai UK executives. These then later entered the used car market. In Belgium, it was launched as the Grandeur, and renamed Azera in 2006.

The Grandeur/Azera had been the most expensive Hyundai model outside of Korea, China, and the Middle East—until the 2008 introduction of the Genesis.

The Azera has a four-wheel independent suspension (multi-link in the rear) and uses the company's new 3.8 L Lambda V6, which produces 265 hp (198 kW). The power is sent to the front wheels through a five or six-speed automatic transmission with a "Shiftronic" manual gear selection. Hyundai claims 6.0 s to accelerate to 60 mph (97 km/h) and a top speed of 155 mph (249 km/h). Fuel economy of 19 mpg_{‑US} (12.4 L/100 km) in the city and 28 mpg_{‑US} (8.4 L/100 km) on the highway is expected.

The 2.2 VGT CRDI diesel engine from the Santa Fe is also available, with the addition of the 2.4 Theta and 2.7 Mu petrol engines in South Korea.

The Limited trim level adds 17-inch alloy wheels, heated front seats, leather seat-upholstery, and a power sun shade in the rear window. The Ultimate Package includes an enhanced audio system with 10 Infinity speakers and a 6-disc CD changer, a power sunroof, powered tilt-telescopic steering wheel, and rain-sensing windshield wipers.

The 2007 model featured a revised gauge pattern and steering wheel controls.

The 2008 model introduced the optional LG Navigation system. It was the first automobile to provide a dual display monitor. The SE models are removed in favor of a GLS model that shares the same 17-inch wheels as the Limited models, and the Aubergine colour is no longer available. A wood-trimmed steering wheel is now only available with the Ultimate Package.

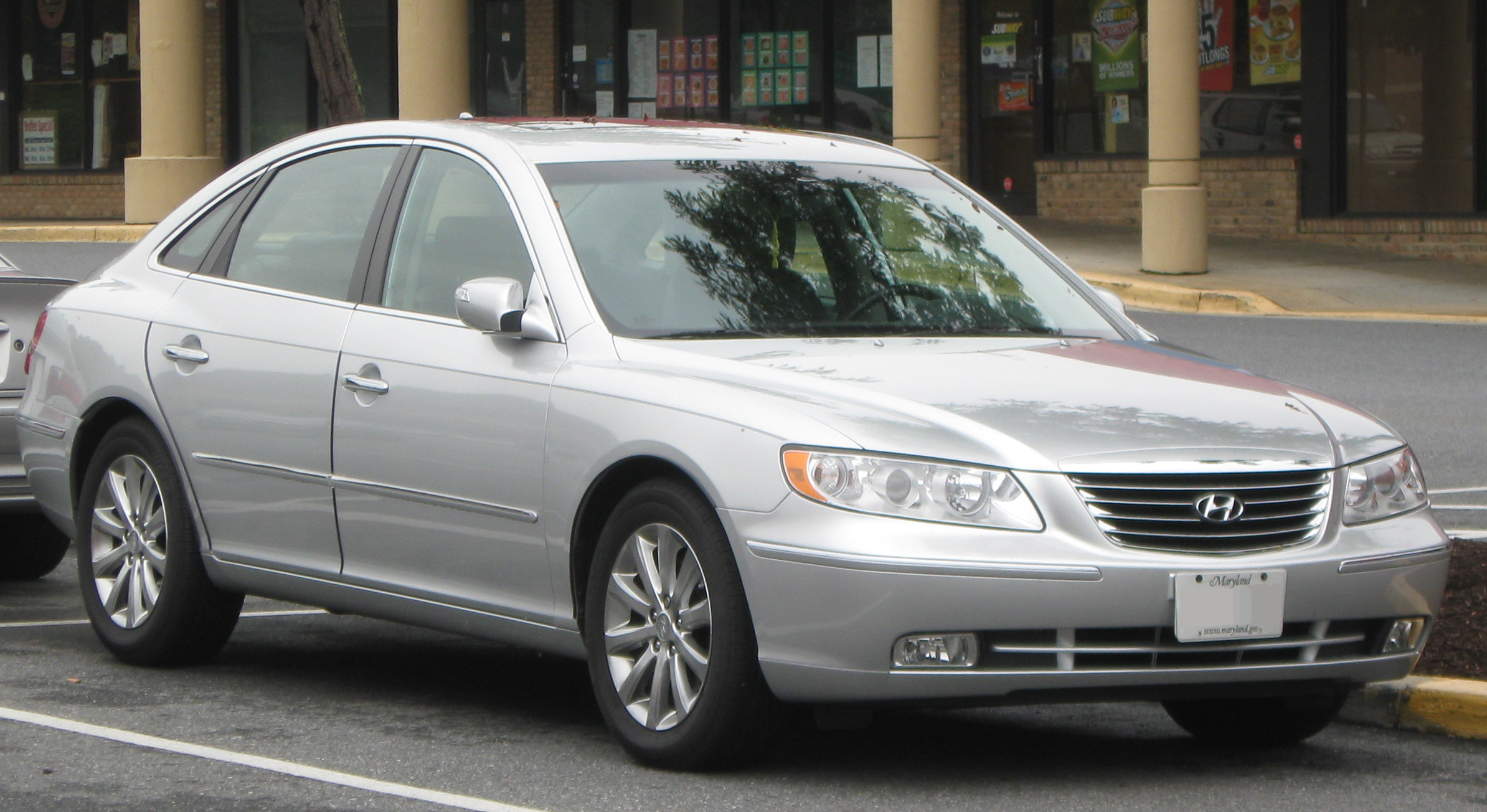
2009 Hyundai Azera (US)

The 2009 model featured revised grille, 17-inch 10-spoke alloy wheels, blue back lit gauges and dashboard lighting (vs. the previous green), dark brown wood grain accents and available hands free Bluetooth phone capability. The audio player display takes the same design as the 2009 Hyundai Sonata, and the controls for the audio player have been redesigned. An auxiliary input jack and iPod integration system became standard, though these were deleted with the navigation system on the Limited trim level. The Limited trim level received a wood-trimmed steering wheel and "hyper-silver" alloy wheels.

The Korean Grandeur offers features not available in North American version, including as Proximity Key with Push Button Start and Bluetooth hands-free capability. A refreshed 2010 model was released on 16 December 2009 that incorporated new 7 split-spoke alloy wheels, LED taillights, rectangular exhaust pipe designs, new side mirrors, redesigned headlights, and new front fascia and grille. New interior amenities include Alcantara leather seats and rear passenger audio and climate controls.

For the 2010 model year the Hyundai Azera was dropped in Canada due to slow sales.

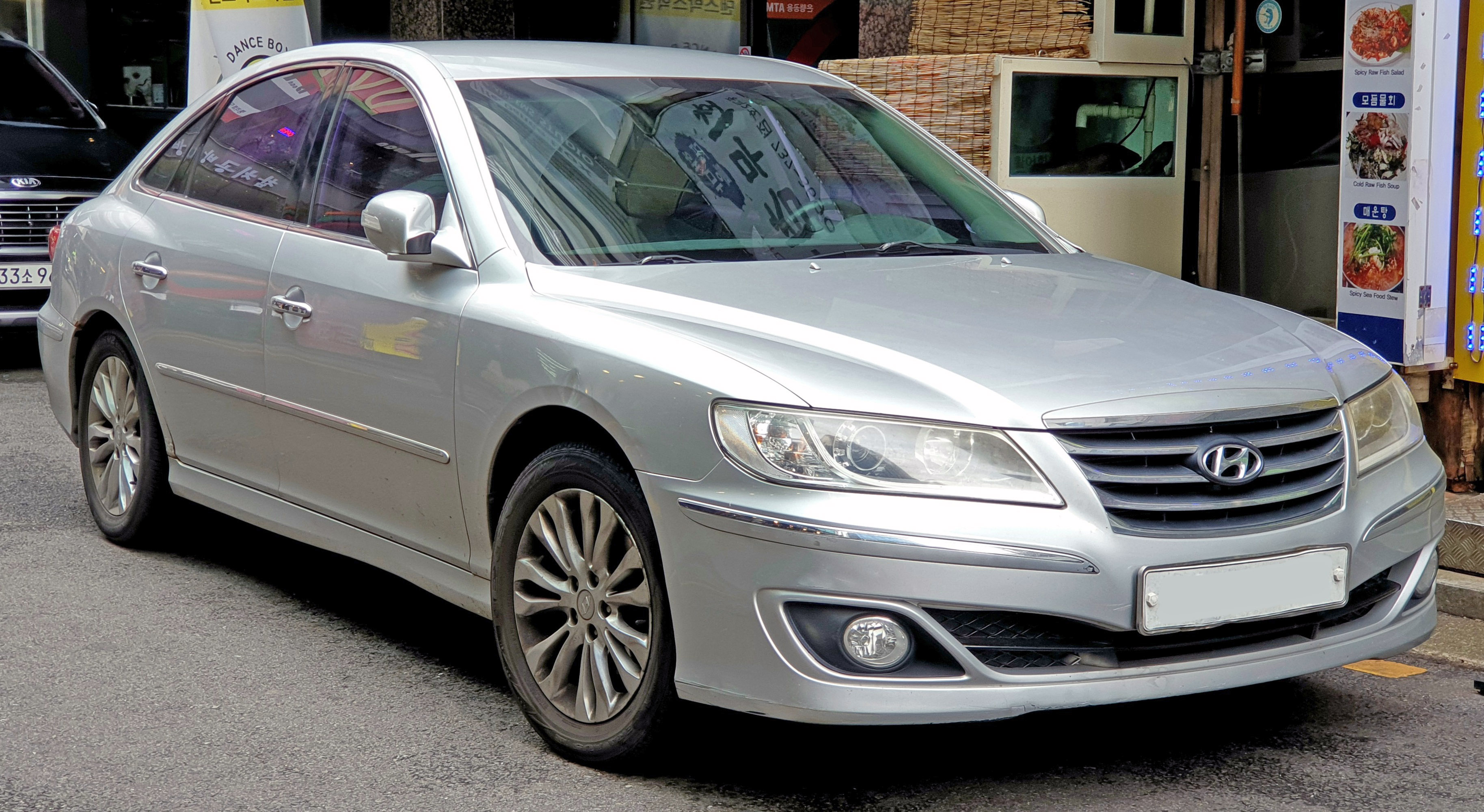

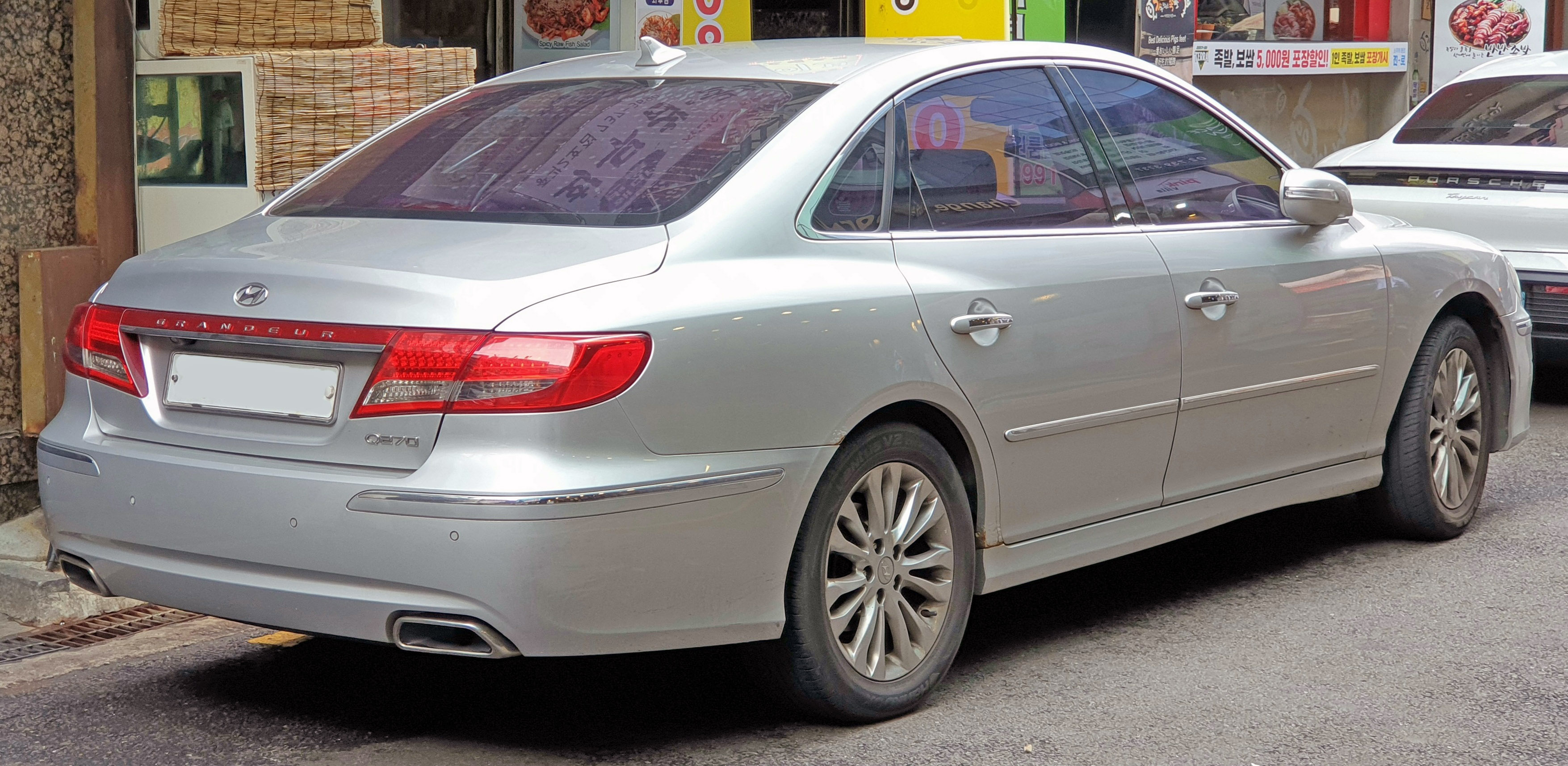
2010 Hyundai Grandeur (South Korea)

For the 2011 model year, Hyundai restyled the Azera with new front and rear fascias, new alloy wheels, and new fog lamps. The engines were updated with dual variable valve timing and the transmission received one more forward speed for a total of six. The 3.3L V6 was now rated at 260 hp, while the 3.8L V6 now made 283 hp. The fuel economy was also improved with 20/28 for 3.3 and 19/27 for 3.8 (EPA rating pending).

In November 2010, Hyundai sued Avera Motors, a start-up automaker based in Rockledge, Florida, over the use of the name "Avera," claiming it was too close to the Azera name. As a result, Avera changed its name in March 2011 to Rivian Automotive.

=== Safety ===
The Azera comes standard with front airbags for driver and passenger, front and rear head curtain airbags and front and rear seat-mounted torso airbags.

According to the Insurance Institute for Highway Safety the Azera received a Good overall score in the frontal crash test and an Acceptable overall score in the side impact test. The driver's pelvis/leg in the side impact category was given a Poor score and the structure/safety category rated Marginal.

NHTSA Azera

Frontal Driver:

Frontal Passenger:

Side Driver:

Side Rear Passenger (earlier models):

Side Rear Passenger (later models):

Rollover:

=== Awards ===
- 2006 Canadian Car of the Year awards: named "Best New Family Car (over CAN$35,000)"
- Strategic Vision, 2007, named the "Winner Strategic Vision's 2007 Total Quality Index (TQI) for the large car segment"
- Kiplinger's Personal Finance "Best in Class" in the $25,000 to $30,000 category, 2007 Azera:
- Kiplinger's Personal Finance 2007 Car Buyer's "Best of 2007 Cars" March 2007.
- Edmunds.com Editors Most Wanted – 2007
- Edmunds.com Editor's Most Wanted Sedan Under $30,000
- Consumer's Digest, 2007, named "A Consumer's Digest Best Buy"
- J.D. Power and Associates – 2006: named "Most Appealing Large Car"
- IIHS, 2006, earned an overall "good" rating in the crash test, frontal offset impacts.
- AutoPacific, 2006, named "Best in Class Vehicle Satisfaction, Large Luxury Car
- Strategic Vision, 2006, named the "Winner Strategic Vision's 2006 Total Value Award for Best Large Car Ownership Experience"

== Fifth generation (HG; 2011) ==
Fifth generation
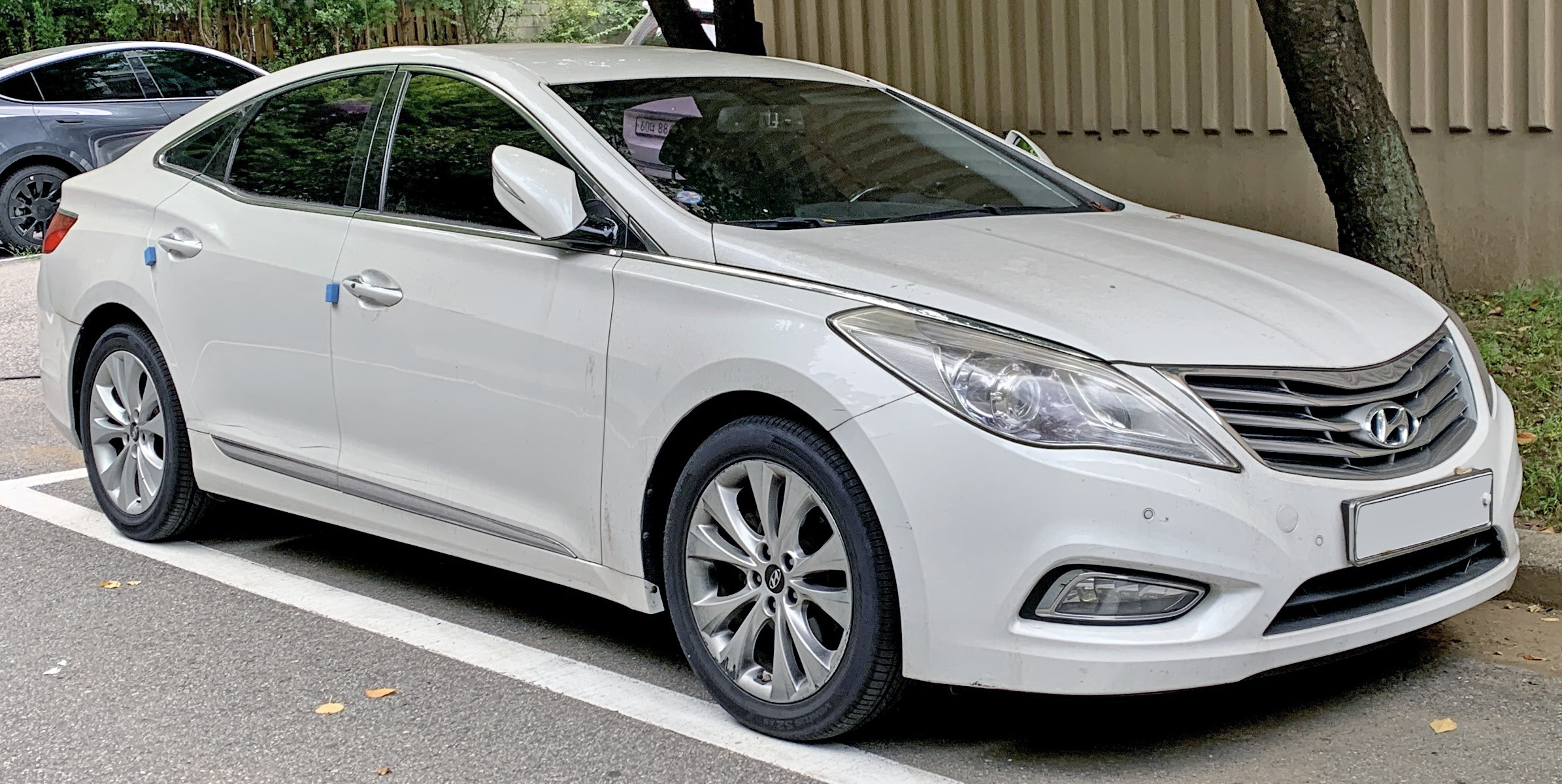
- Hyundai Grandeur (HG; pre-facelift)

Overview
- Model code: HG
- Also called: Hyundai Azera
- Production: 2011–2016 (petrol, LPG and diesel); 2013–2017 (hybrid)
- Model years: 2012–2017
- Assembly: South Korea: Asan

Body and chassis
- Body style: 4-door sedan
- Platform: Y6 platform
- Related: Hyundai Aslan; Kia Cadenza; Hyundai Sonata; Kia Optima

Powertrain
- Engine: Petrol: 2.4 L Theta II MPi I4; 2.4 L Theta II GDI I4; 3.0 L Lambda II MPi V6; 3.0 L Lambda II GDI V6; 3.3 L Lambda II GDI V6; Hybrid petrol: 2.4 L Theta II HEV MPi I4; Diesel: 2.2 L R II CRDI VGT I4
- Transmission: 6-speed automatic

Dimensions
- Wheelbase: 2,845 mm (112.0 in)
- Length: 4,910 mm (193.3 in); 4,920 mm (193.7 in)
- Width: 1,860 mm (73.2 in)
- Height: 1,470 mm (57.9 in)
- Curb weight: 1,500–1,700 kg (3,307–3,748 lb)

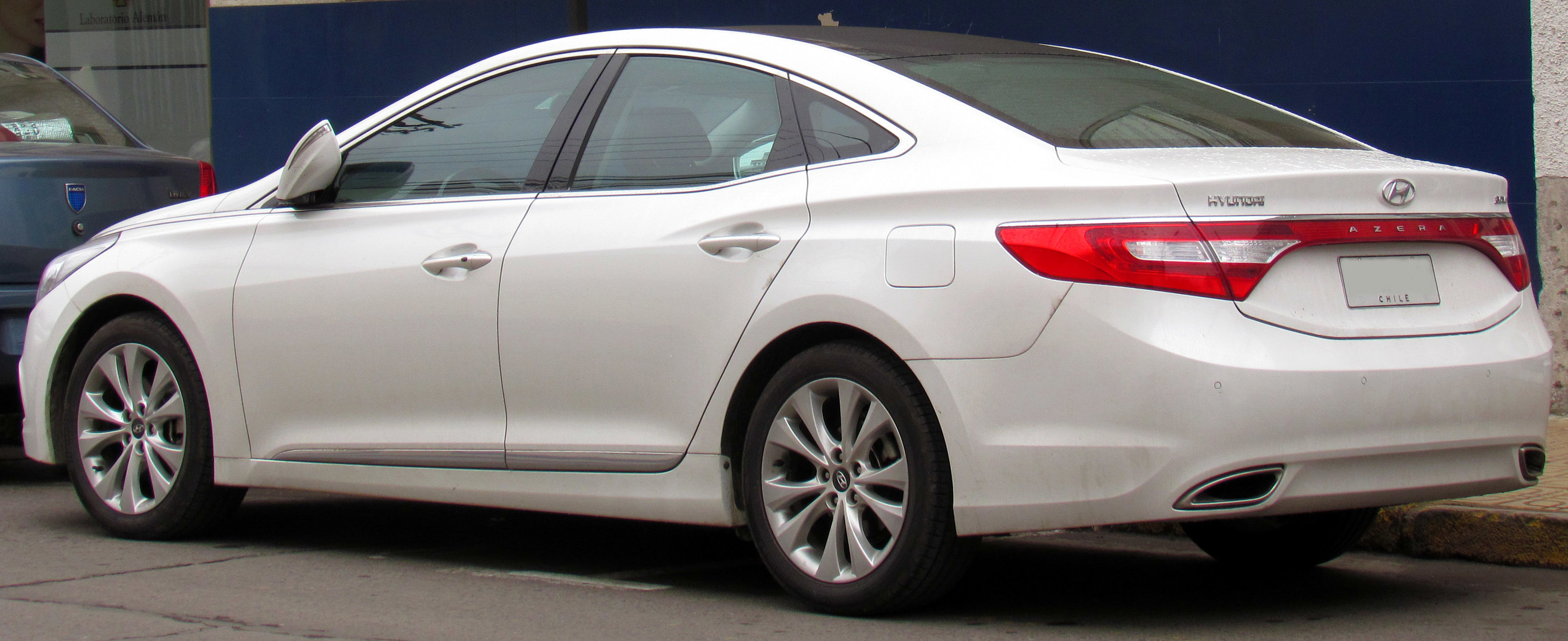
Hyundai Azera GLS (Chile)

The fifth generation Grandeur/Azera was unveiled at the 2011 Los Angeles International Auto Show as a 2012 model. It was developed over a period of three and half years with a cost of 450 million dollars. The fifth generation was marketed as the Grandeur in South Korea — and in most export markets as the "Hyundai Azera."

Dimensionally, the Azera fit between the mid-size Sonata and the rear-wheel drive Genesis. The Azera's competitors include cars such as the Ford Taurus, Dodge Charger, Chevrolet Impala, and entry-level luxury (or near-luxury) cars such as the Buick LaCrosse, Nissan Maxima, Toyota Avalon, Chrysler 300.

=== Initial release ===
The Grandeur HG was released by Hyundai with an all new appearance and an engine The Grandeur HG followed the "fluidic sculpture" design of modern Hyundai vehicles. This design is dubbed as the "Grand Glide" concept.

The four-cylinder has a fuel economy of 12.8 km/L (36 mpg_{‑imp}; 30 mpg_{‑US}) (7.8 L/100 km) and the V6 is rated at 11.8 km/L (33 mpg_{‑imp}; 28 mpg_{‑US}) (8.5 L/100 km). The Premium model features adaptive cruise control and a semi-automatic parking assist system.

Early Korean models of Grandeur include Theta II 2.4 GDI, Lambda II 3.0 GDI. In Korea an E-VGT R2.2 Diesel engine with 202 PS (149 kW; 199 hp) is available. Korean version equipment includes auto high beam, lane departure warning, blind spot detection, and electric park brake.

==== Powertrain ====
Engines
Model	Years	Type/code	Power@rpm	Torque@rpm	0–100 km/h (0-62 mph) (official)	Top Speed
Petrol
Theta II 2.4 MPi	2011–2016	2,359 cc (144.0 cu in) I4	180 PS (132 kW; 178 hp) @ 6,000 rpm	23.6 kg⋅m (231 N⋅m; 171 lbf⋅ft) @ 4,000 rpm	9.8s	210 km/h (130 mph)
Theta II 2.4 GDi	2011–2016	2,359 cc (144.0 cu in) I4	201 PS (148 kW; 198 hp) @ 6,300 rpm	25.5 kg⋅m (250 N⋅m; 184 lbf⋅ft) @ 4,250 rpm		
Lambda II 3.0 MPi	2011–2016	2,999 cc (183.0 cu in) V6	250 PS (184 kW; 247 hp) @ 6,400 rpm	29 kg⋅m (284 N⋅m; 210 lbf⋅ft) @ 5,300 rpm	8.4s	223 km/h (139 mph)
Lambda II 3.0 GDi	2011–2016	2,999 cc (183.0 cu in) V6	270 PS (199 kW; 266 hp) @ 6,400 rpm	31.6 kg⋅m (310 N⋅m; 229 lbf⋅ft) @ 5,300 rpm	7.9s	230 km/h (143 mph)
Lambda II 3.3 GDi	2011–2016	3,342 cc (203.9 cu in) V6	297 PS (218 kW; 293 hp) @ 6,400 rpm	35.3 kg⋅m (346 N⋅m; 255 lbf⋅ft) @ 5,200 rpm	7.4s	
Hybrid
Theta II 2.4 MPi Hybrid	2013–2017	2,359 cc (144.0 cu in) I4	204 PS (150 kW; 201 hp) @ 5,500 rpm	27 kg⋅m (265 N⋅m; 195 lbf⋅ft) @ 4,500 rpm		
Diesel
R II 2.2 CRDi	2014–2016	2,199 cc (134.2 cu in) I4	202 PS (149 kW; 199 hp) @ 3,800 rpm	45 kg⋅m (441 N⋅m; 325 lbf⋅ft) @ 1,750–2,750 rpm		

All models come standard with a 6-speed automatic transmission and is the only transmission available.

==== Hyundai Grandeur Hybrid (2013–2017) ====
It is a version of Hyundai Grandeur for South Korea market, with 2.4-litre Theta II MPi (159PS) engine, 47PS electric motor, projector beam headlights, LED tail lights, a dual exhaust system, 17-inch aluminum wheels, Nappa leather seats, a leather-wrapped steering wheel and wood grain trim, dual-zone automatic climate control, heated seats, a rear view camera, a USB charging system, an infotainment system with a 6-inch display. Options include a panoramic sunroof, a premium audio system and GPS navigation.

The vehicle went on sale on December 17, 2013.

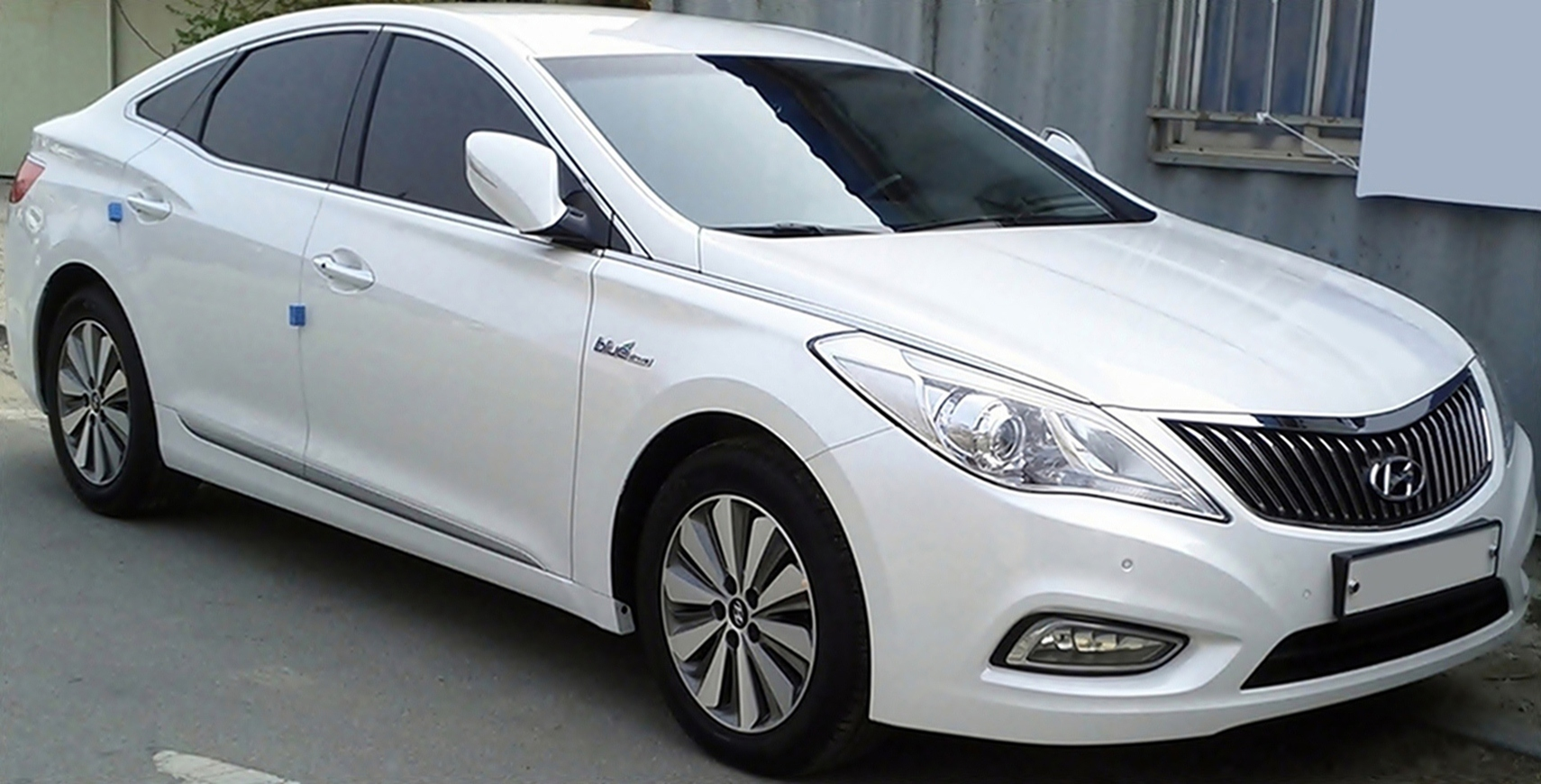
2014 Hyundai Grandeur Hybrid (South Korea)

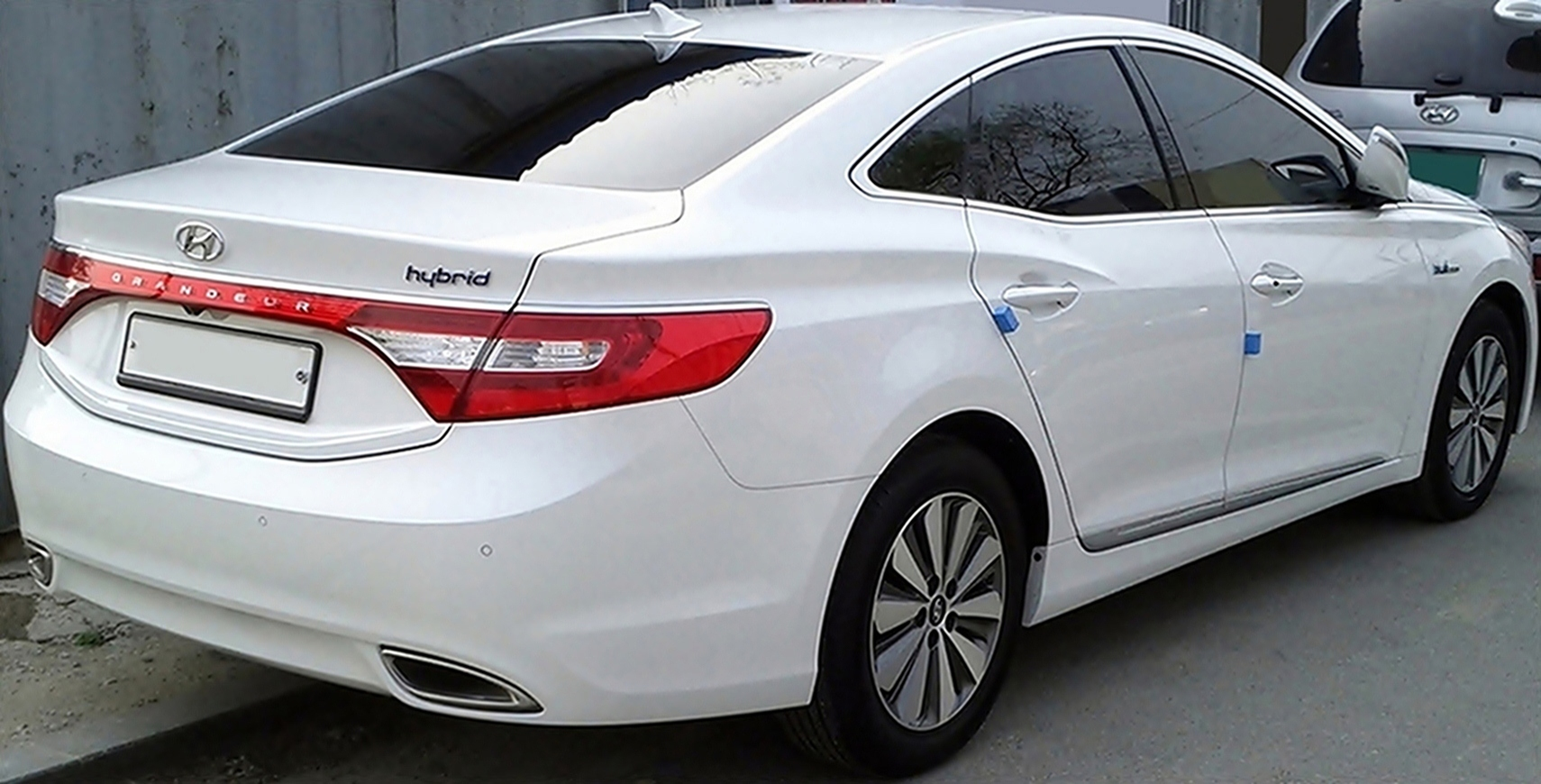
2014 Hyundai Grandeur Hybrid (South Korea)

=== 2014 model year update ===
Changes to US models of Hyundai Azera include lower starting price of $31,000 ($1,250 reduction from 2013), refined steering feel and precision, standard 6-inch colour LCD audio display with rear view camera, standard driver blind-spot mirror, new electroluminescent gauge cluster with colour LCD trip computer, new 8-inch navigation system standard on Limited, power-folding side mirrors standard on Limited, Hyundai Assurance Connected Care telematics services standard for three years.

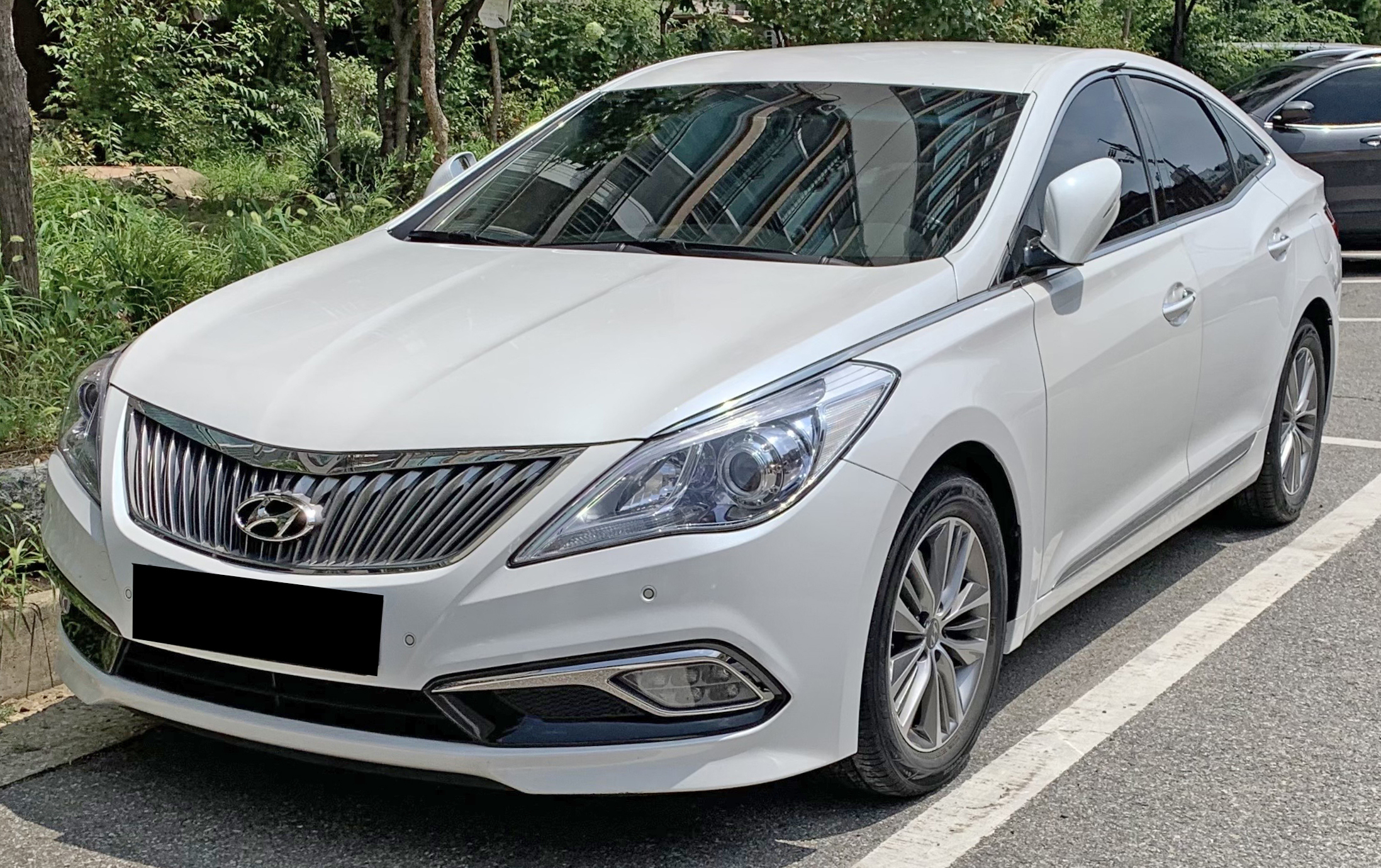
Hyundai Grandeur (HG; facelift)

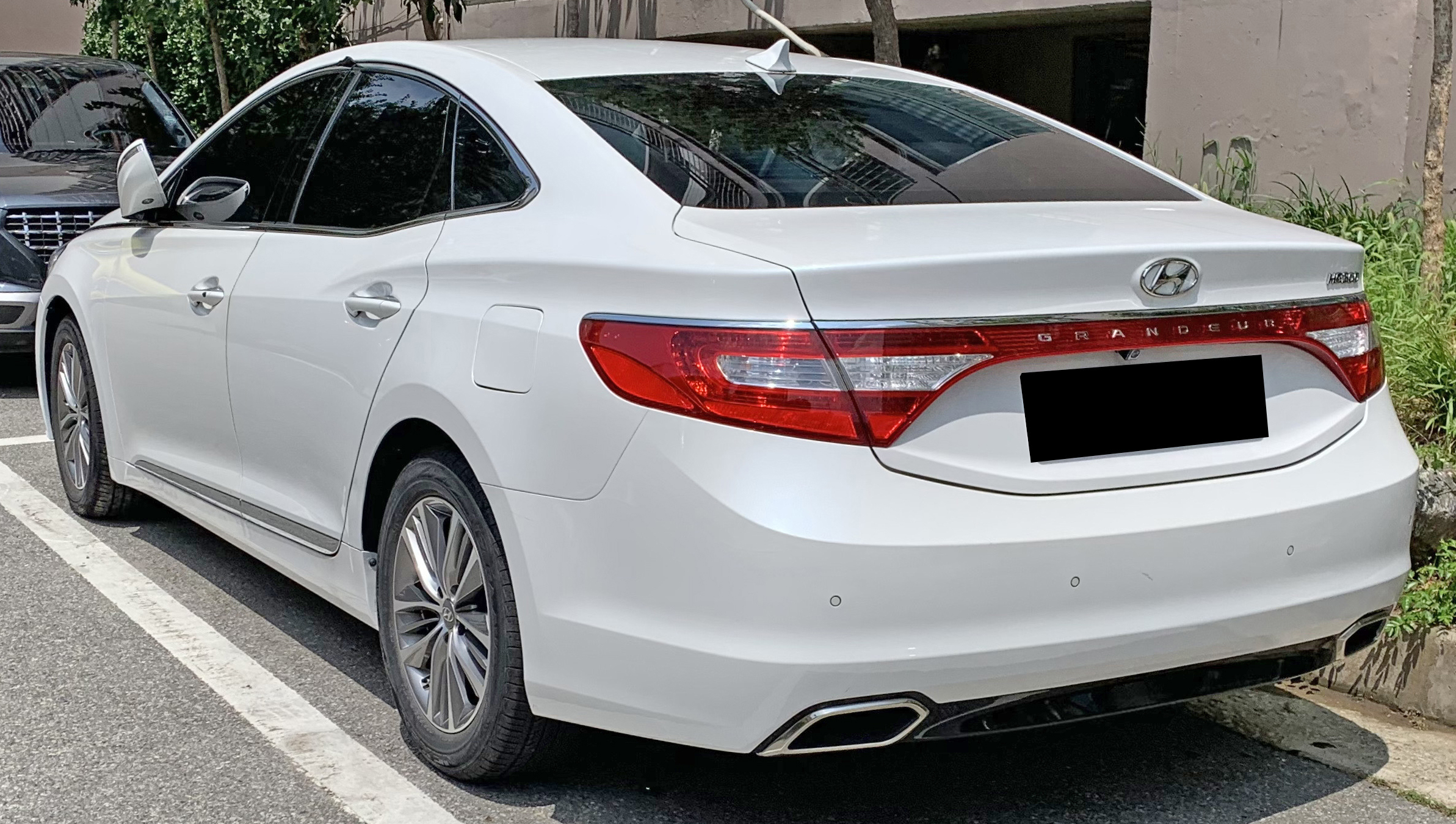
Hyundai Grandeur (HG; facelift)

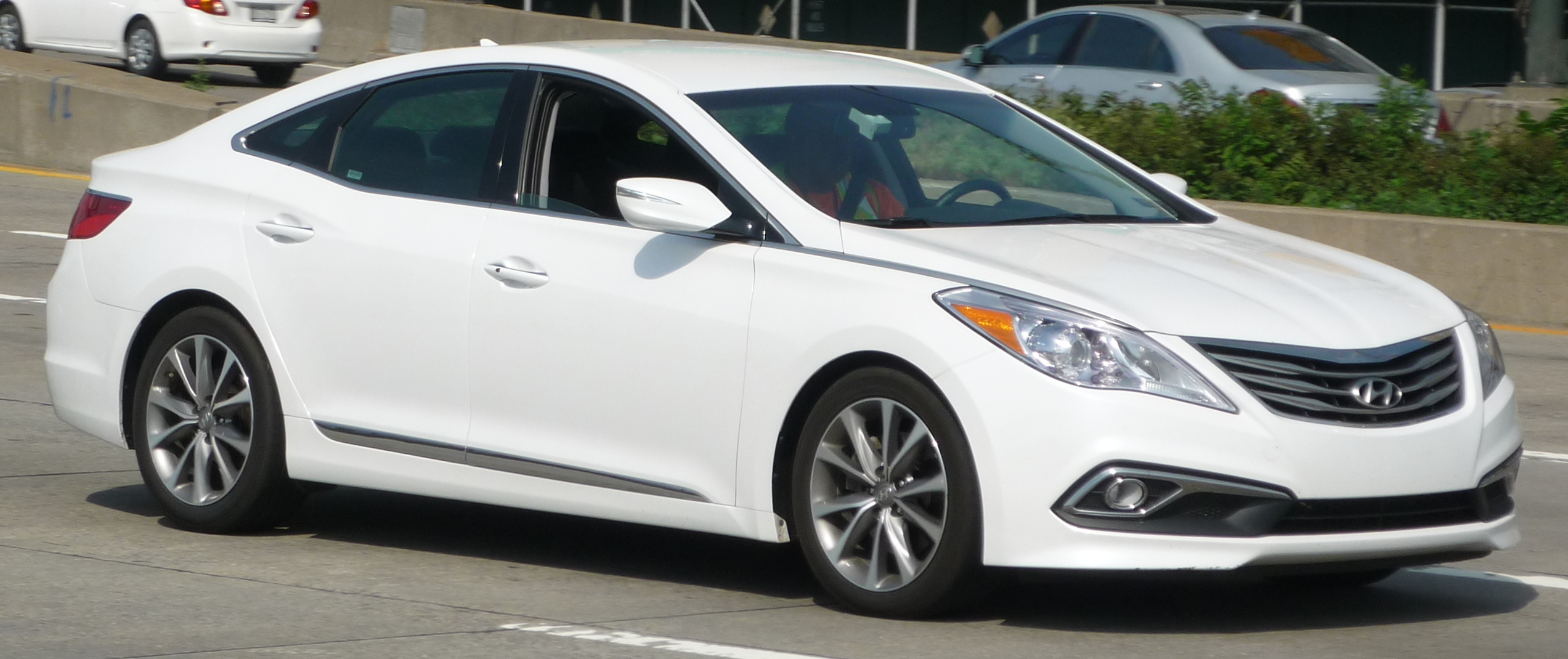
Hyundai Azera (HG; facelift, US)

== Sixth generation (IG; 2016) ==
Sixth generation
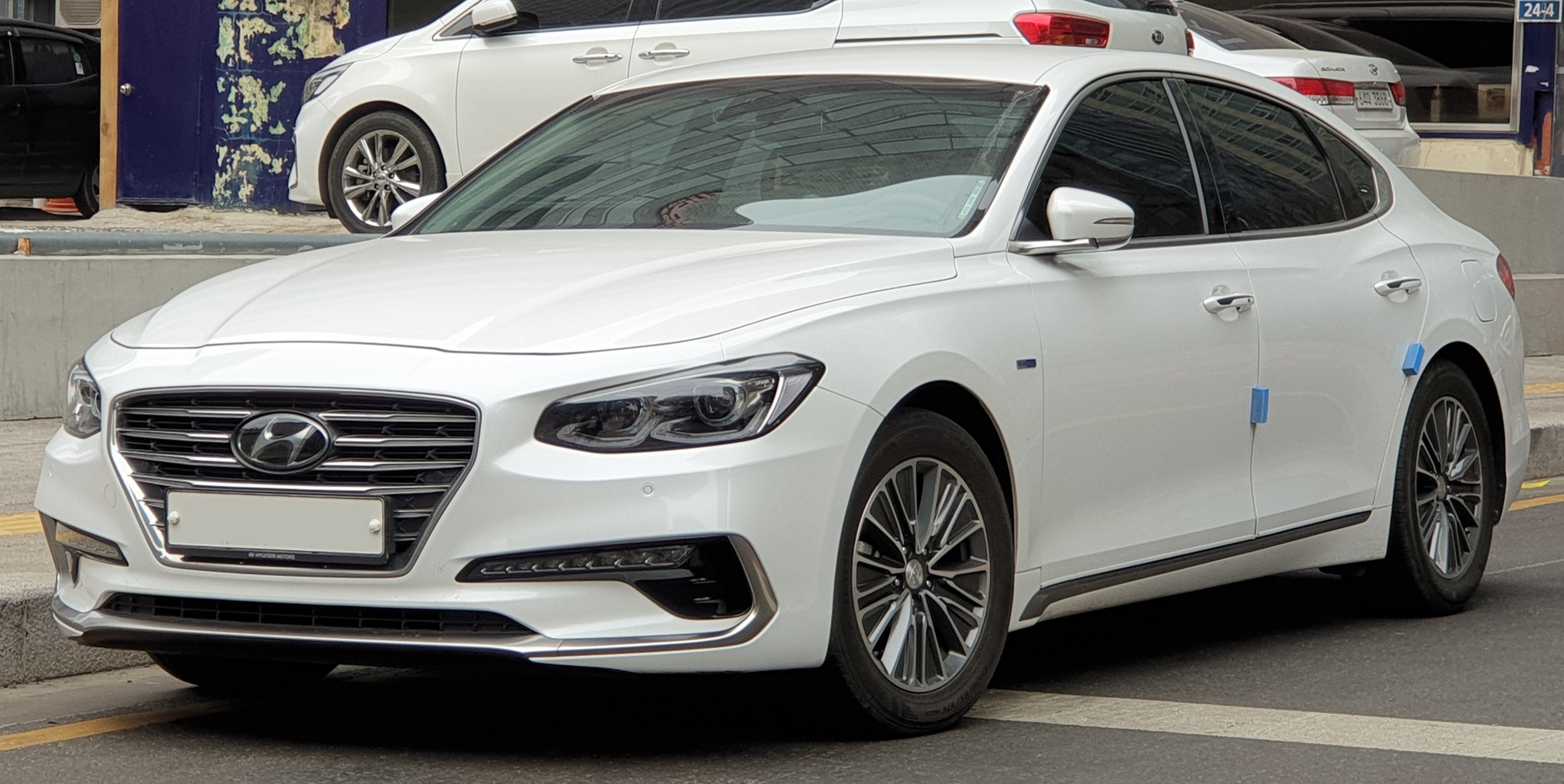
- Hyundai Grandeur Hybrid (IG; pre-facelift)

Overview
- Model code: IG
- Also called: Hyundai Azera
- Production: 2016–2022
- Assembly: South Korea: Asan (Hyundai Motor Asan Plant)

Body and chassis
- Body style: 4-door sedan
- Platform: Y7 platform (pre-facelift); N platform (facelift)
- Related: Kia Cadenza; Hyundai Sonata; Kia Optima

Powertrain
- Engine: Petrol: 2.4 L Theta II GDI I4; 2.5 L Smartstream G2.5 GDI I4; 3.0 L Lambda II MPi V6; 3.0 L Lambda II GDI V6; 3.3 L Lambda II GDI V6; 3.5 L Lambda II MPI V6; Hybrid petrol: 2.4 L Theta II HEV MPi I4; LPG: 3.0 L Lambda II LPi V6; Diesel: 2.2 L R II CRDI I4
- Electric motor: 52 PS (38 kW; 51 hp) Electric motor
- Transmission: 6-speed automatic 8-speed automatic
- Hybrid drivetrain: HEV
- Battery: High-voltage Li-ion battery

Dimensions
- Wheelbase: 2,845 mm (112.0 in) (pre-facelift); 2,885 mm (113.6 in) (facelift)
- Length: 4,930 mm (194.1 in) (pre-facelift); 4,990 mm (196.5 in) (facelift)
- Width: 1,865 mm (73.4 in) (pre-facelift); 1,875 mm (73.8 in) (facelift)
- Height: 1,470–1,480 mm (57.9–58.3 in)
- Curb weight: 1,550–1,647 kg (3,417–3,631 lb) (2.4L/2.5L); 1,616–1,719 kg (3,563–3,790 lb) (3.0L/3.3L/3.5L); 1,675 kg (3,693 lb) (Hybrid)

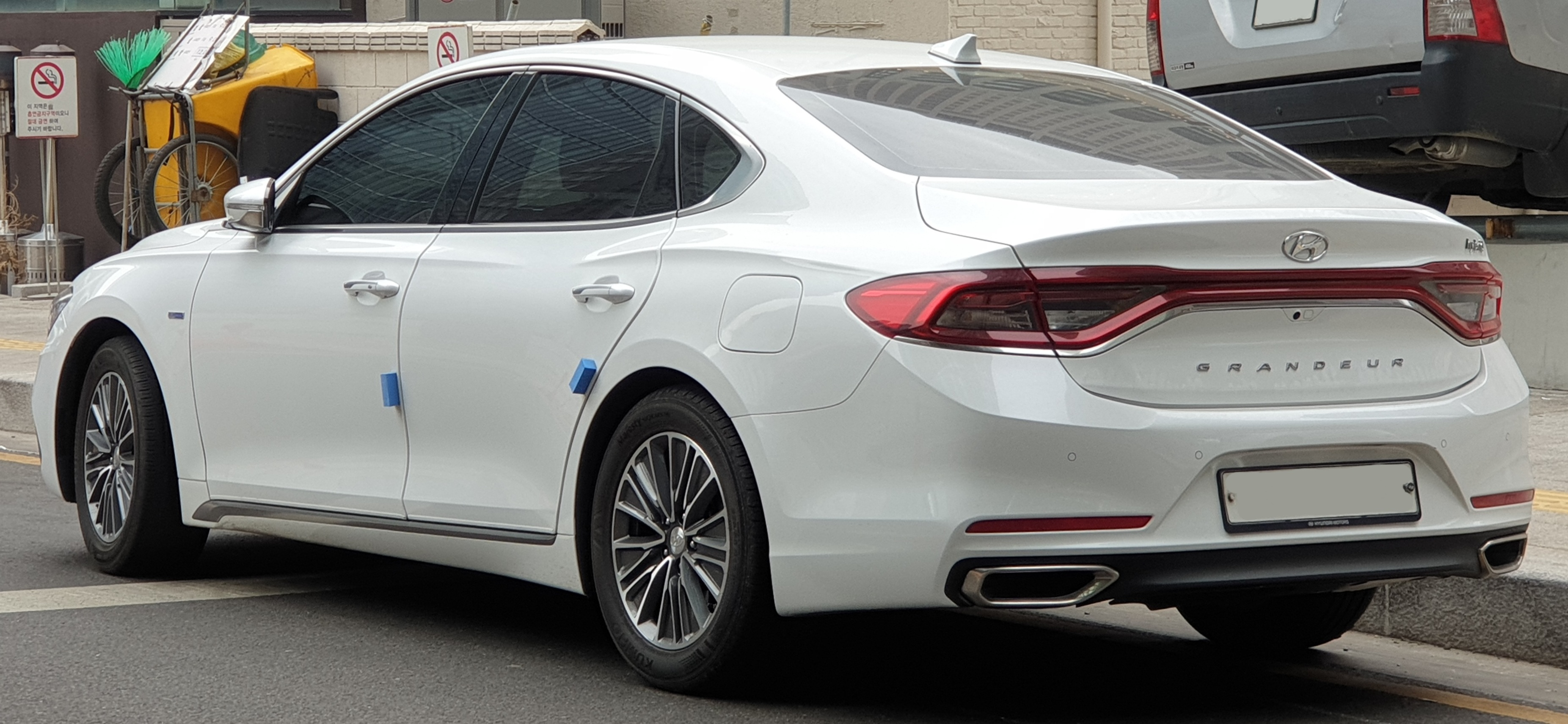
Rear view

Hyundai unveiled the sixth generation Grandeur on October 27, 2016. The sixth generation model was not sold in North America due to slow sales of the preceding generation; other than Hyundai's new luxury division Genesis Motors, the Sonata became the largest and most expensive sedan marketed by Hyundai in the US. A Hybrid model was added in March 2017. The 2.2-litre diesel engine option was discontinued in 2018. 132,000 Grandeurs were sold in 2017 and about 110,000 vehicles were sold in 2018. It is the best-selling vehicle in its category in the South Korean market.

=== Facelift ===
A facelifted Grandeur was launched in November 2019. The car is bigger with the wheelbase growing by 40 mm (1.6 in), length by 60 mm (2.4 in) and width by 10 mm (0.4 in). Exterior changes include a bigger grille with turn signals and daytime running lights (DRL) integrated into the grille's diamond patterns plus new headlights and taillights. Interior changes include a new optional 12.3-inch widescreen infotainment system, new shift-by-wire (SBW) buttons replacing the old gear lever, and a new touchscreen for climate controls. Other changes include a new remote parking system and an improved autonomous emergency braking system.

For the powertrain, a new Smartstream G2.5 GDi with an 8-speed automatic transmission replaced the 2.4L Theta II GDi engine with the 6-speed automatic transmission and both 3.0L Lambda II MPi/GDi engine options are discontinued.

The Sonata, which had been selling the most as a People's car for a long time in the Korean market, saw a sharp decline in sales, but the Grandeur sold 90,000 to 100,000 vehicles a month, ranking first in sales.

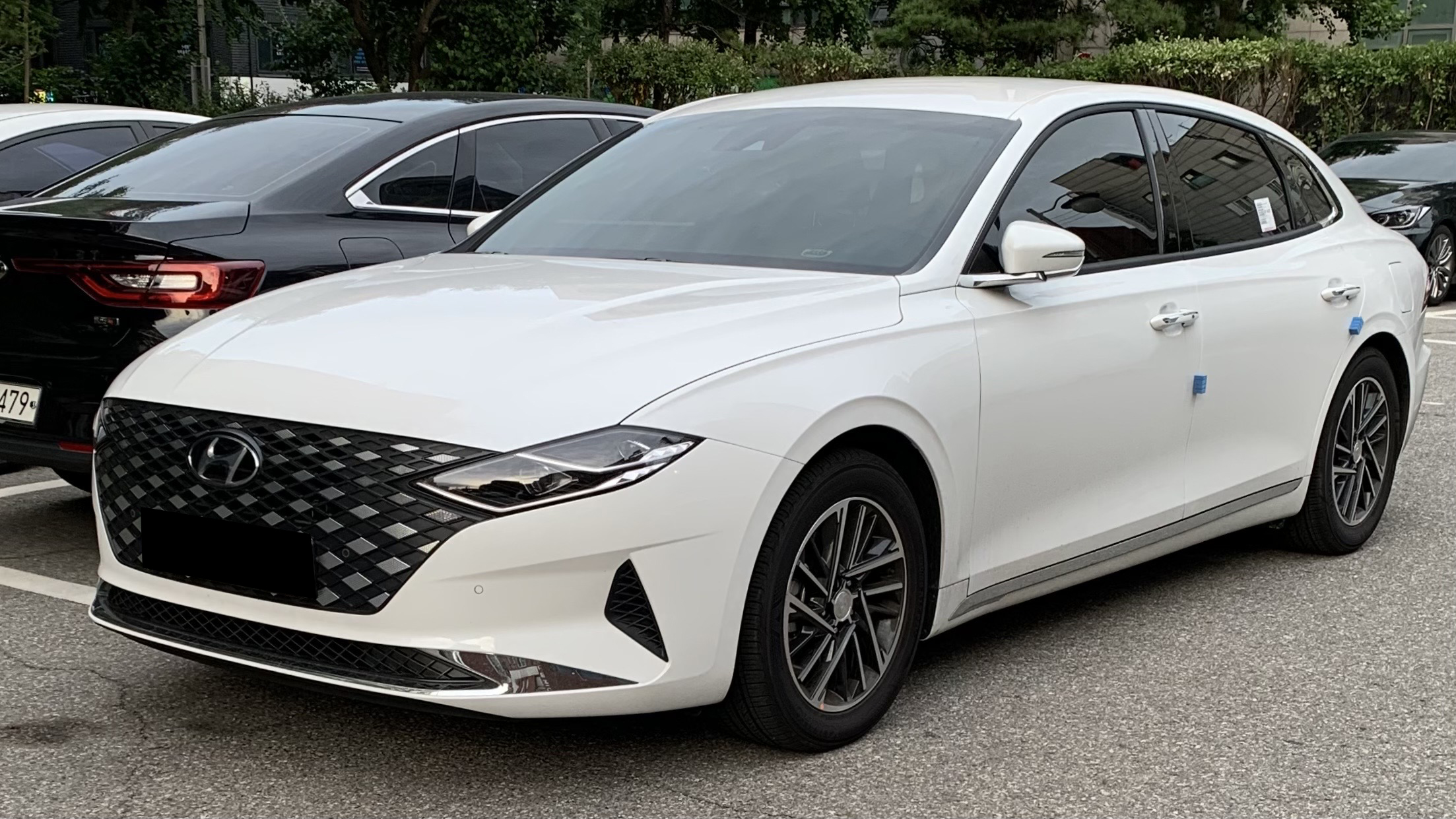
Hyundai Grandeur (facelift)

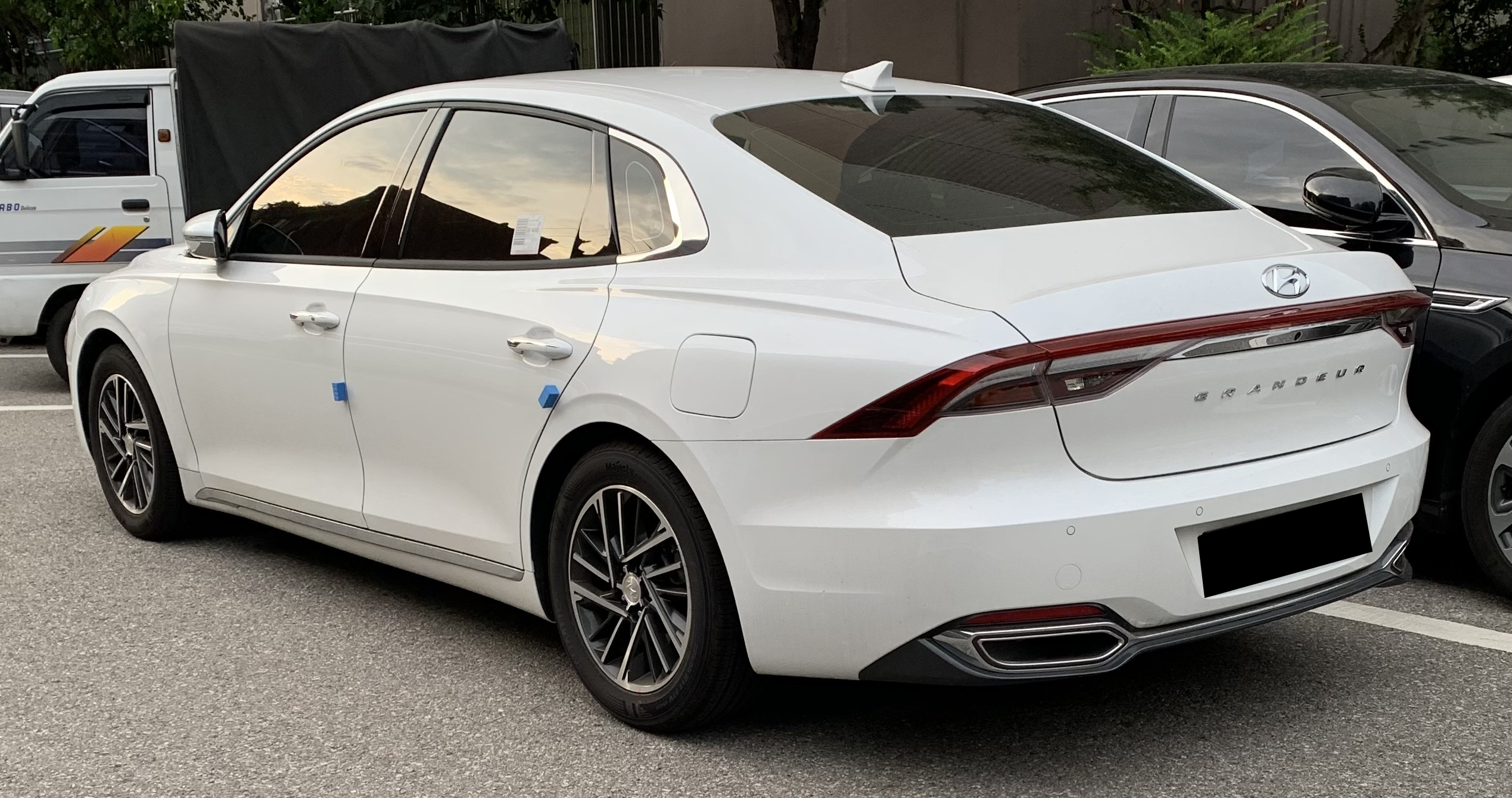
Hyundai Grandeur (facelift)

=== Engines and transmissions ===
Petrol engines
Model	Years	Type/code	Transmission	Power	Torque	Acceleration 0–100 km/h (0-62 mph) (official)	Top Speed (official)
Petrol
Theta II 2.4 GDi	2016–2019	2,359 cc (144.0 cu in) I4	6-speed automatic	190 PS (140 kW; 187 hp) at 6,000 rpm	24.6 kg⋅m (241 N⋅m; 178 lbf⋅ft) at 4,000 rpm	9.7s	213 km/h (132 mph)
Smartstream G2.5 GDi	2019–2022	2,497 cc (152.4 cu in) I4	8-speed automatic	198 PS (146 kW; 195 hp) at 6,100 rpm	25.3 kg⋅m (248 N⋅m; 183 lbf⋅ft) at 4,000 rpm	9.0s	217 km/h (135 mph)
Lambda II 3.0 MPi	2017–2019	2,999 cc (183.0 cu in) V6	6-speed automatic	250 PS (184 kW; 247 hp) at 6,400 rpm	29.0 kg⋅m (284 N⋅m; 210 lbf⋅ft) at 5,000 rpm	8.4s	222 km/h (138 mph)
Lambda II 3.0 GDi	2016–2019	2,999 cc (183.0 cu in) V6	8-speed automatic	266 PS (196 kW; 262 hp) at 6,400 rpm	31.4 kg⋅m (308 N⋅m; 227 lbf⋅ft) at 5,300 rpm	7.9s	230 km/h (143 mph)
Lambda II 3.3 GDi	2017–2022	3,342 cc (203.9 cu in) V6	8-speed automatic	290 PS (213 kW; 286 hp) at 6,400 rpm	35.0 kg⋅m (343 N⋅m; 253 lbf⋅ft) at 5,200 rpm		
Lambda II 3.5 MPi	2017–2022	3,470 cc (212 cu in) V6	8-speed automatic	290 PS (213 kW; 286 hp) at 6,600 rpm	34.5 kg⋅m (338 N⋅m; 250 lbf⋅ft) at 5,000 rpm	7.4s	230 km/h (143 mph)
Hybrid
Theta II 2.4 MPi Hybrid	2017–2022	2,359 cc (144.0 cu in) I4	6-speed automatic	159 PS (117 kW; 157 hp) at 5,500 rpm	21 kg⋅m (206 N⋅m; 152 lbf⋅ft) at 4,500 rpm		
Theta II 2.4 MPi Hybrid	2017–2022	Electric motor	6-speed automatic	52 PS (38 kW; 51 hp)	20.9 kg⋅m (205 N⋅m; 151 lbf⋅ft) at 0–1,400 rpm		
Theta II 2.4 MPi Hybrid	2017–2022	Combined	6-speed automatic	200 PS (147 kW; 197 hp) at 5,500 rpm	27 kg⋅m (265 N⋅m; 195 lbf⋅ft)		
LPG
Lambda II 3.0 LPi	2016–2022	2,999 cc (183.0 cu in) V6	6-speed automatic	235 PS (173 kW; 232 hp) at 6,000 rpm	28.6 kg⋅m (280 N⋅m; 207 lbf⋅ft) at 4,500 rpm		
Diesel
R II 2.2 CRDi	2016–2018	2,199 cc (134.2 cu in) I4	8-speed automatic	202 PS (149 kW; 199 hp) at 3,800 rpm	45.0 kg⋅m (441 N⋅m; 325 lbf⋅ft) at 1,750–2,750 rpm		

== Seventh generation (GN7; 2022) ==
Seventh generation
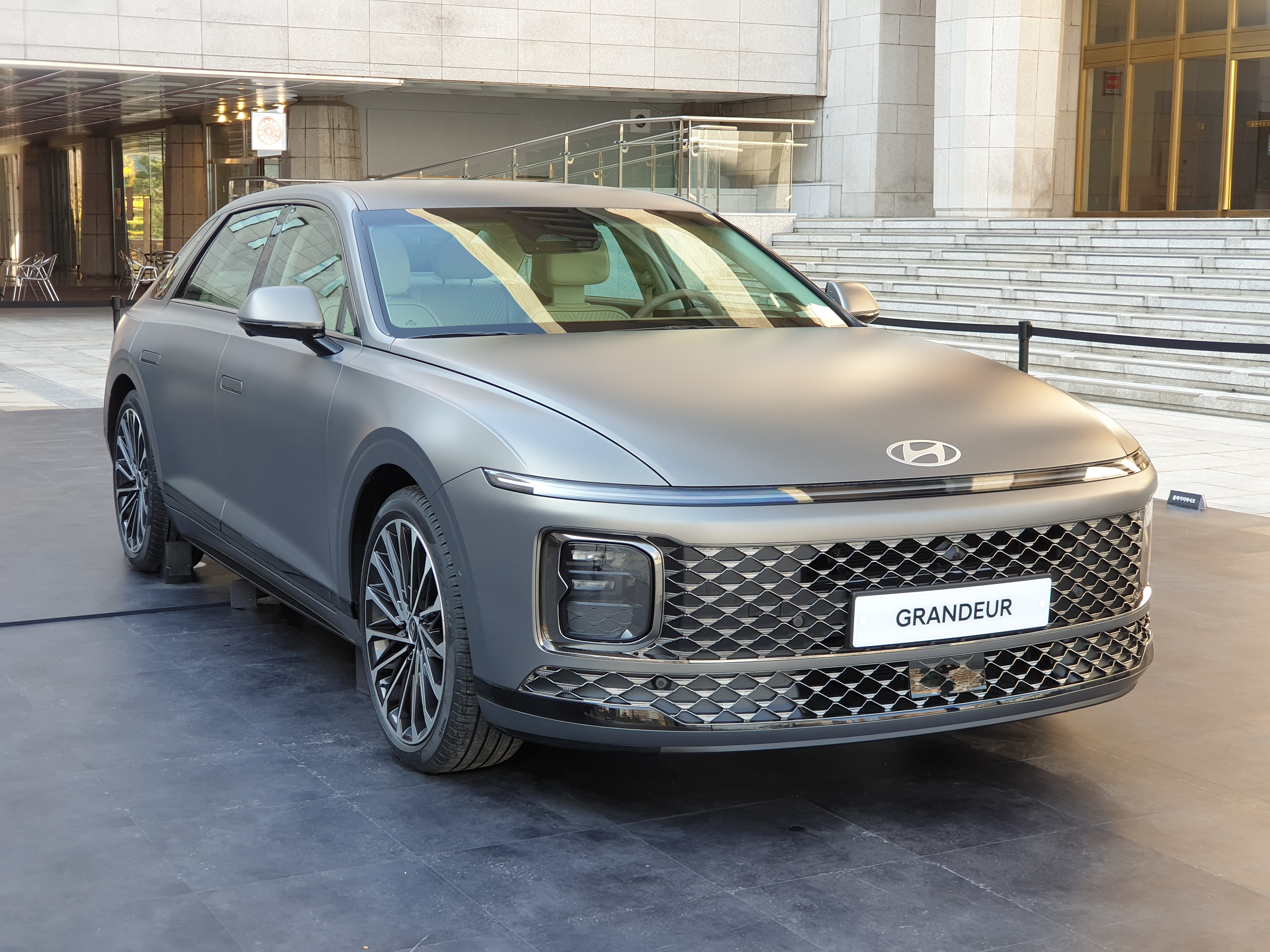
- 2022 Hyundai Grandeur Calligraphy (South Korea)

Overview
- Model code: GN7
- Also called: Hyundai Azera
- Production: November 2022 – present
- Assembly: South Korea: Asan (Hyundai Motor Asan Plant)

Body and chassis
- Body style: 4-door sedan
- Layout: Front-engine, front-wheel-drive; Front-engine, all-wheel-drive
- Platform: Hyundai-Kia N3 platform
- Related: Kia K8

Powertrain
- Engine: Petrol: 2.5 L Smartstream G2.5 GDi I4; 3.5 L Smartstream G3.5 GDi V6; Petrol hybrid: 1.6 L Smartstream G1.6 T-GDi I4; LPG: 3.5 L Smartstream G3.5 LPi V6
- Electric motor: Permanent magnet synchronous
- Transmission: 6-speed automatic 8-speed automatic
- Hybrid drivetrain: Parallel hybrid (HEV)

Dimensions
- Wheelbase: 2,895 mm (114.0 in)
- Length: 5,035 mm (198.2 in)
- Width: 1,880 mm (74.0 in)
- Height: 1,460 mm (57.5 in)
- Curb weight: 1,620–1,800 kg (3,571–3,968 lb)

The seventh-generation Grandeur was released in South Korea on November 14, 2022, six years after the sixth-generation Grandeur. Compared to the previous model, the overall length is 5,035 mm (198.2 in), which is 45 mm (1.8 in) longer, and the wheelbase and rear overhang have been increased by 10 mm (0.4 in) and 50 mm (2.0 in), respectively.

The exterior features DRL and positioning lamps that are seamlessly connected in a full-width horizontal layout with integrated turn signal functions, and cowl points that have moved to the rear. The interior has a wrap-around structure, featuring softly spreading ambient mood lamps and a pattern on the door trim.

The seventh-generation Grandeur is equipped with the ccNC infotainment system, two built-in cameras, two digital keys, interior fingerprint authentication system, reclining (rear seat), and electric door curtains. The hybrid model is equipped with an E-motion drive that uses a drive motor to improve driving performance.

It shares its platform with the Kia K8, utilizing the Hyundai-Kia's mid-size platform called the N3.

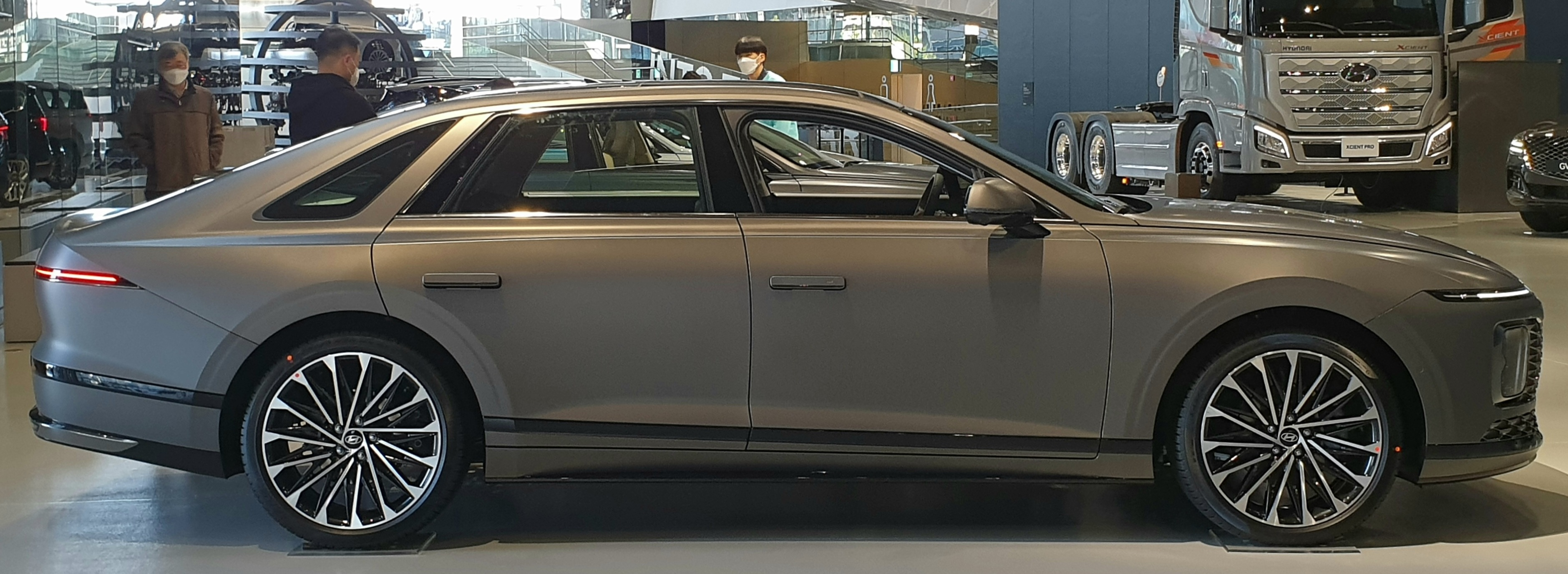
Side view

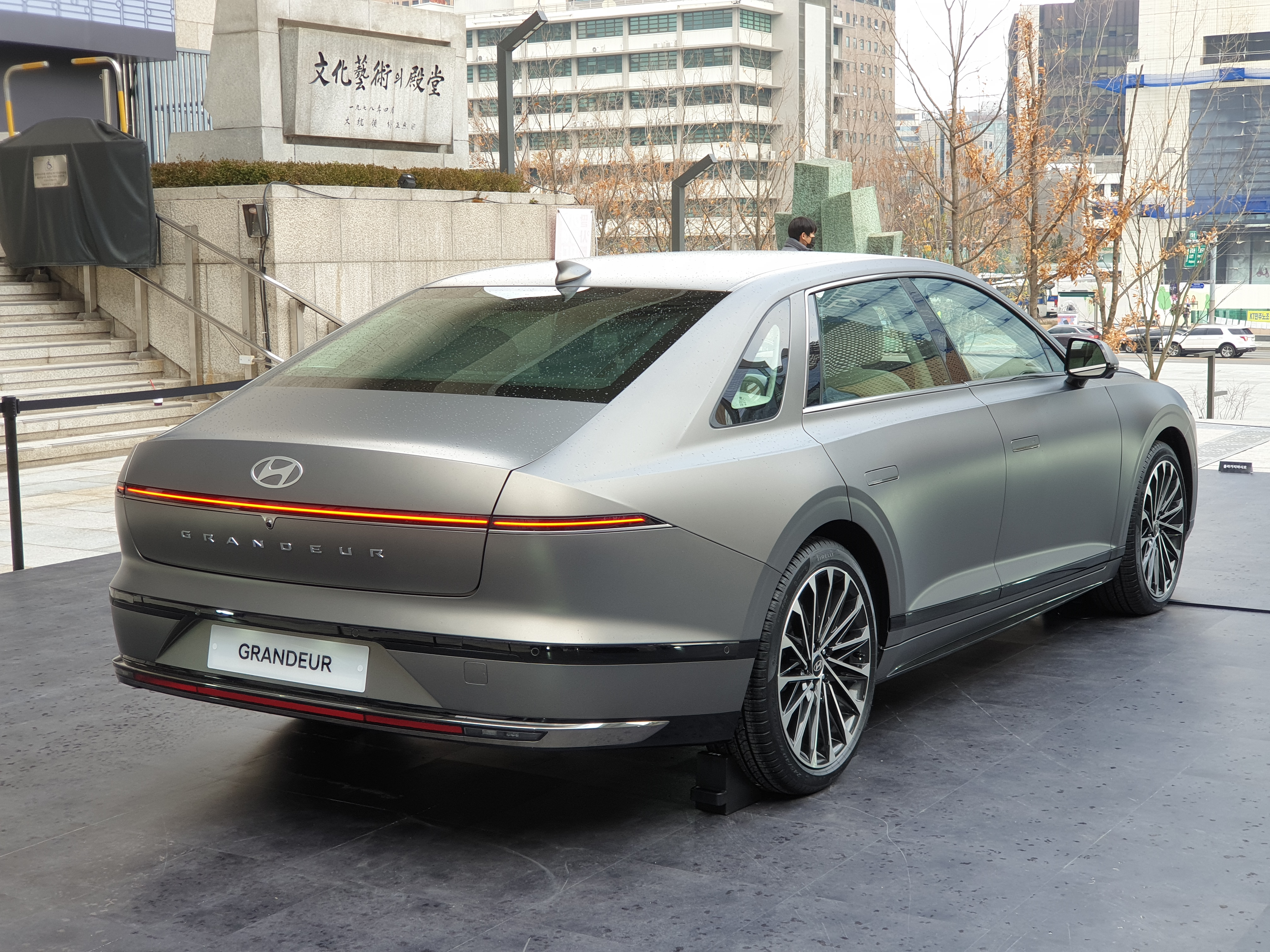
Rear view

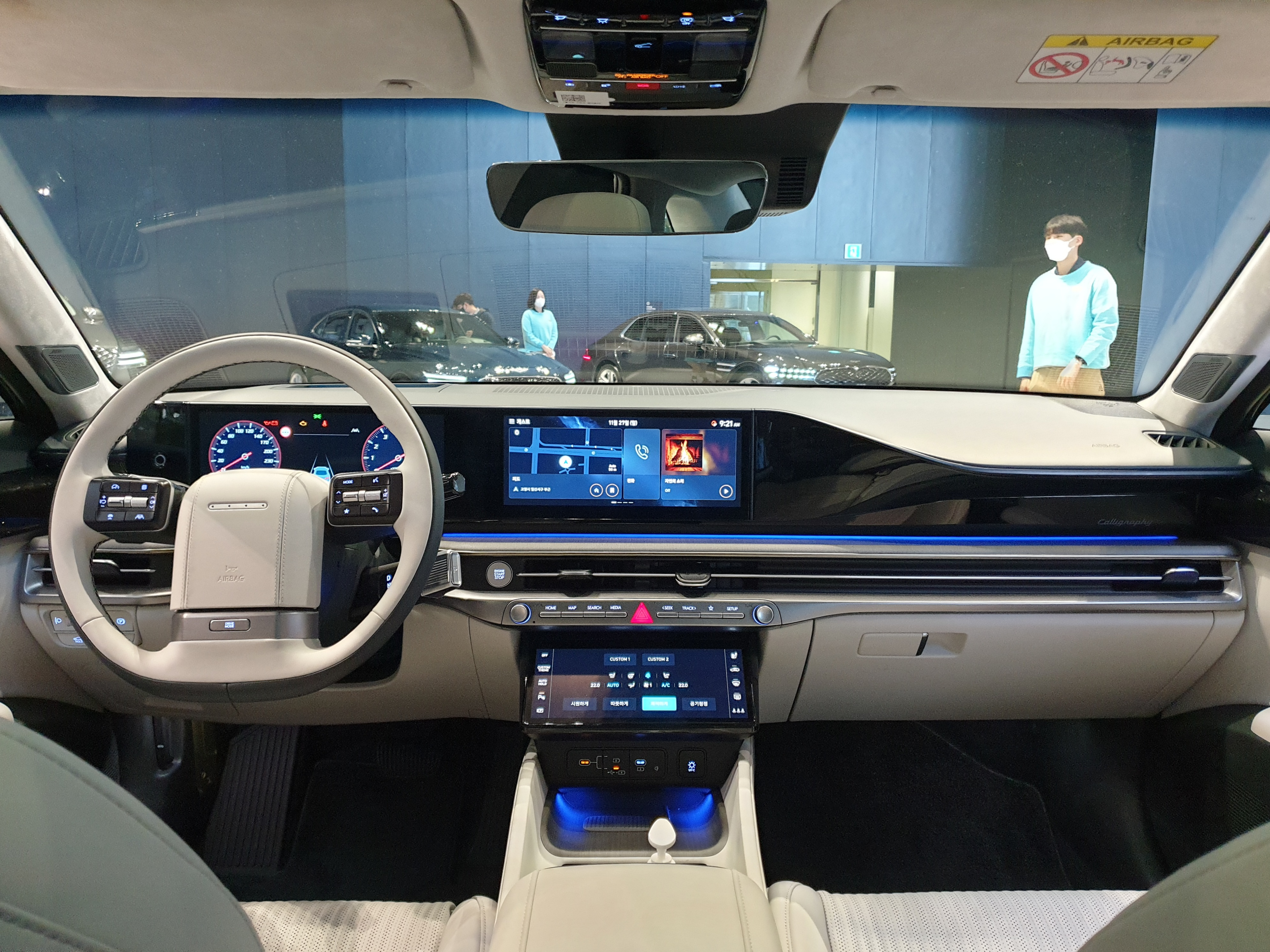
Interior

=== Facelift ===
The facelifted seventh-generation Grandeur was launched in April 2026. Updates include a more efficient hybrid powertrain, a smaller digital instrument cluster and a larger infotainment display running Hyundai's new Android-based Pleos system.

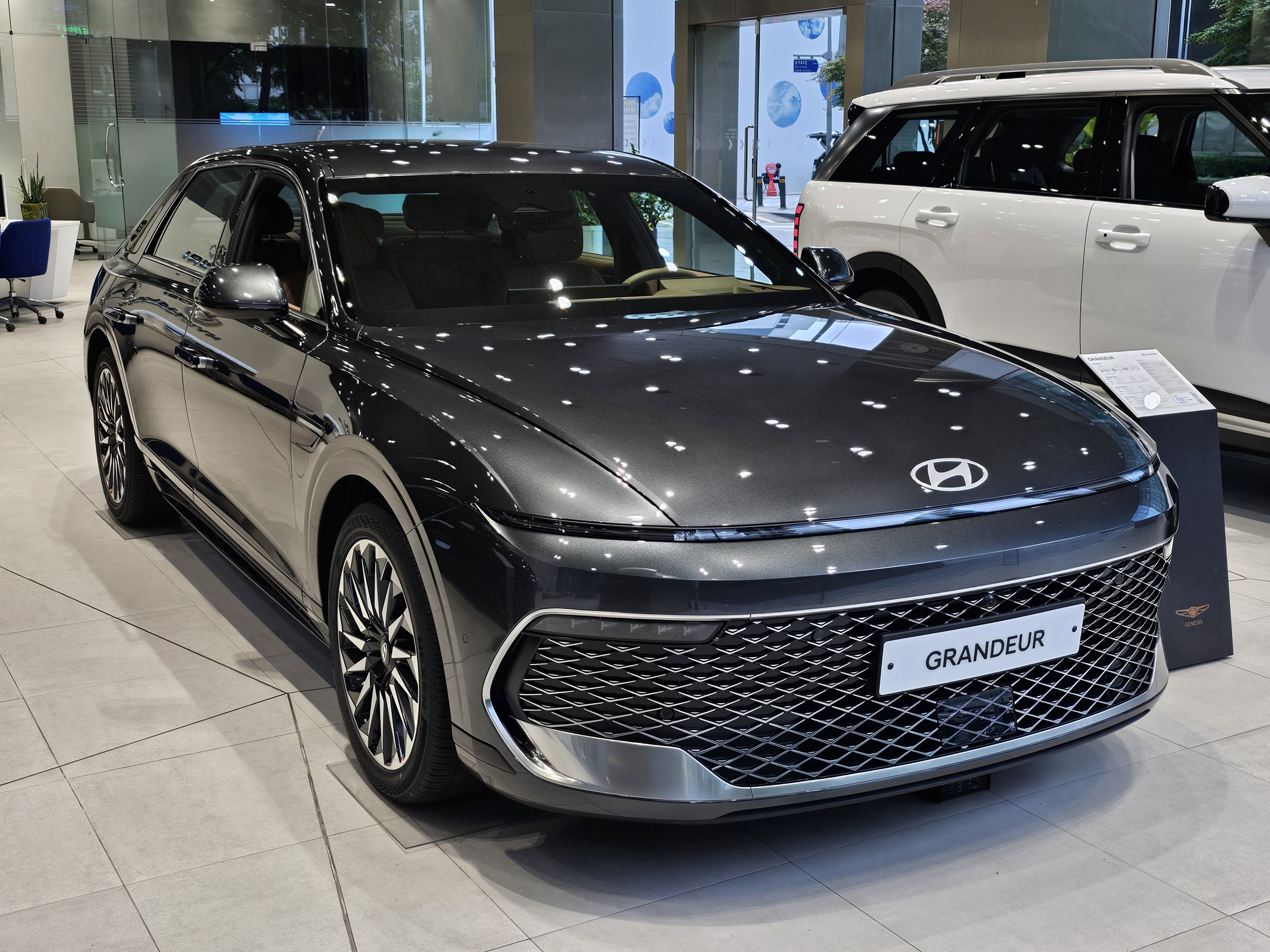
Hyundai Grandeur facelift

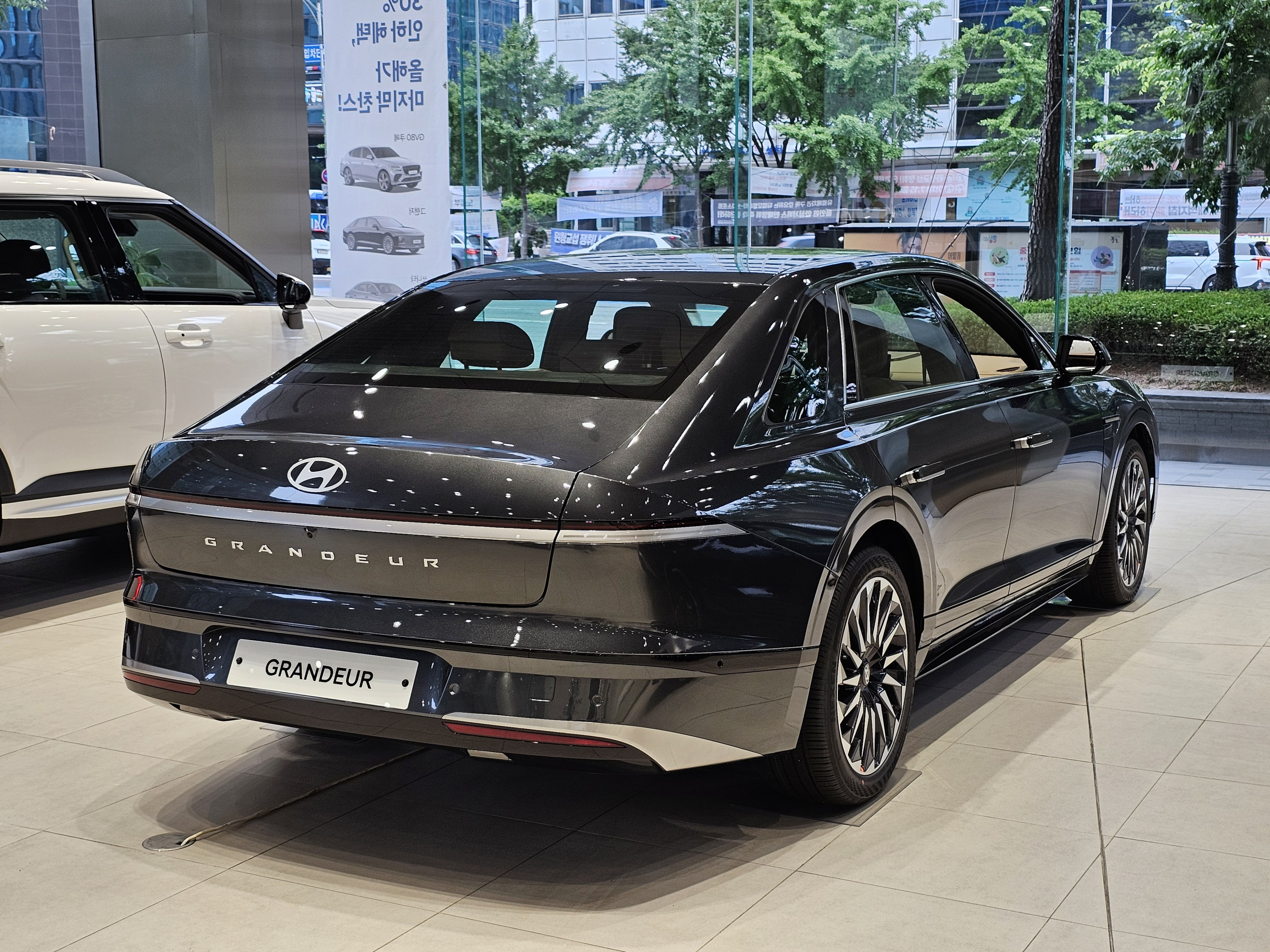
Rear view

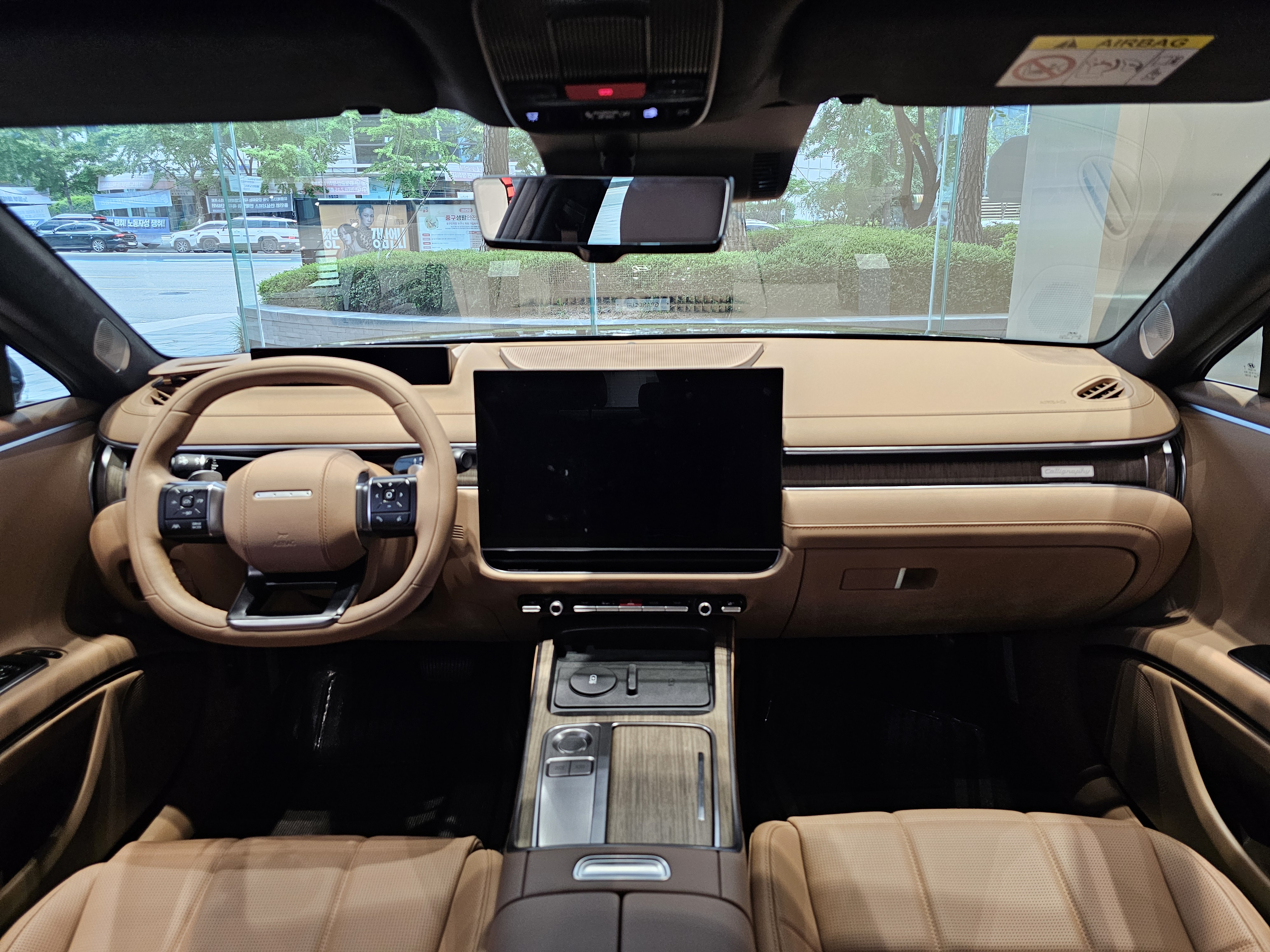
Interior

=== Powertrain ===
Specifications
Model	Years	Transmission	Power	Torque	0–100 km/h (0-62 mph) (Official)
Petrol
Smartstream G2.5 GDI	2022–present	8-speed automatic	198 PS (146 kW; 195 hp) @ 6,100 rpm	25.3 kg⋅m (248 N⋅m; 183 lbf⋅ft) @ 4,000 rpm	
Smartstream G3.5 GDI	2022–present	8-speed automatic	300 PS (221 kW; 296 hp) @ 6,400 rpm	36.6 kg⋅m (359 N⋅m; 265 lbf⋅ft) @ 5,000 rpm	
Hybrid
Smartstream G1.6 T-GDI Hybrid	2022–present	6-speed automatic	230 PS (169 kW; 227 hp) @ 5,500 rpm	35.7 kg⋅m (350 N⋅m; 258 lbf⋅ft) @ 1,500–4,400 rpm	
LPG
Smartstream L3.5 LPi	2022–present	8-speed automatic	240 PS (177 kW; 237 hp) @ 6,000 rpm	32 kg⋅m (314 N⋅m; 231 lbf⋅ft) @ 4,500 rpm	

== Sales ==
Since its introduction to the U.S. market in late 2000, the XG/Azera had been a consistent seller until late 2008, when it suffered a significant drop in sales. Although there are several possible explanations for this decline, the Hyundai Genesis sedan was introduced to the U.S. market in late 2008, suggesting that the more sophisticated rear-wheel drive Genesis may have cannibalized sales of the Azera. The Hyundai Genesis sedan is considered by auto journalists to be a rival to the aforementioned full-size and near-luxury vehicles that the 2012 Azera is positioned against, such as the Ford Taurus, Toyota Avalon, and Buick LaCrosse.

Year	South Korea	United States
2000		2,004
2001	49,484	17,884
2002	60,572	16,666
2003	54,188	17,928
2004	45,705	16,630
2005	73,458	17,645
2006	84,752	26,833
2007	88,350	21,948
2008	93,879	14,461
2009	75,822	3,808
2010	32,697	3,051
2011	107,543	1,524
2012	88,477	8,431
2013	88,495	11,221
2014	92,987	7,232
2015	87,146	5,539
2016	68,409	4,942
2017	131,950	3,060
2018	113,101	628
2019	103,349	-
2020	145,463	-
2021	89,084	-
2022	67,030	-
2023	113,062	-
2024	71,656	-

== See also ==
- List of Hyundai vehicles
