= Kia Sorento =

Mid-size crossover SUV manufactured by Kia

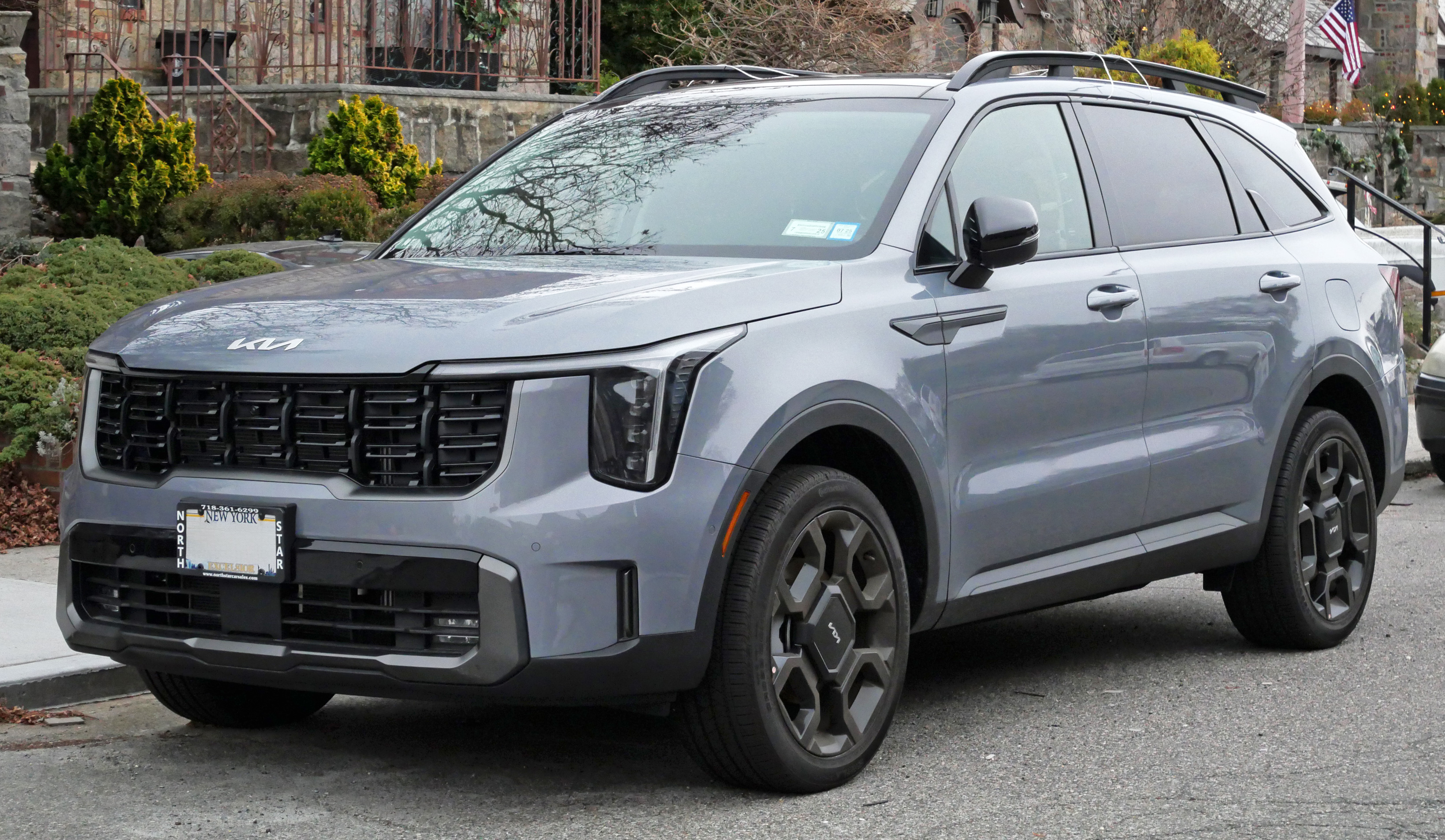

Overview
- Manufacturer: Kia
- Production: 2002–present
- Model years: 2002–present

Body and chassis
- Class: Compact SUV (2002–2009); Mid-size crossover SUV (2009–present)
- Body style: 5-door SUV
- Layout: Front-engine, rear-wheel-drive (2002–2009); Front-engine, front-wheel-drive (2009–present); Front-engine, all-wheel-drive (2002–present)
- Chassis: Body-on-frame (2002–2010); Unibody (2009–present)

The Kia Sorento (Korean: 기아 쏘렌토, romanized: Gia Sorento) is a series of two-wheel drive and four-wheel drive family SUVs manufactured by the South Korean manufacturer Kia since 2002 through four generations. Initially a compact SUV built on a body-on-frame chassis, the second-generation Sorento transitioned to a larger car-based platform which placed it into the mid-size crossover SUV class, and has been developed alongside the Hyundai Santa Fe. It is presumed to be named after the Italian city of Sorrento, though Kia did not confirm this. However, Kia released the cryptic post teasing the launch of Sorento in India featuring the image of Piazza Tasso located in Sorrento, Italy.

== First generation (BL; 2002) ==
First generation
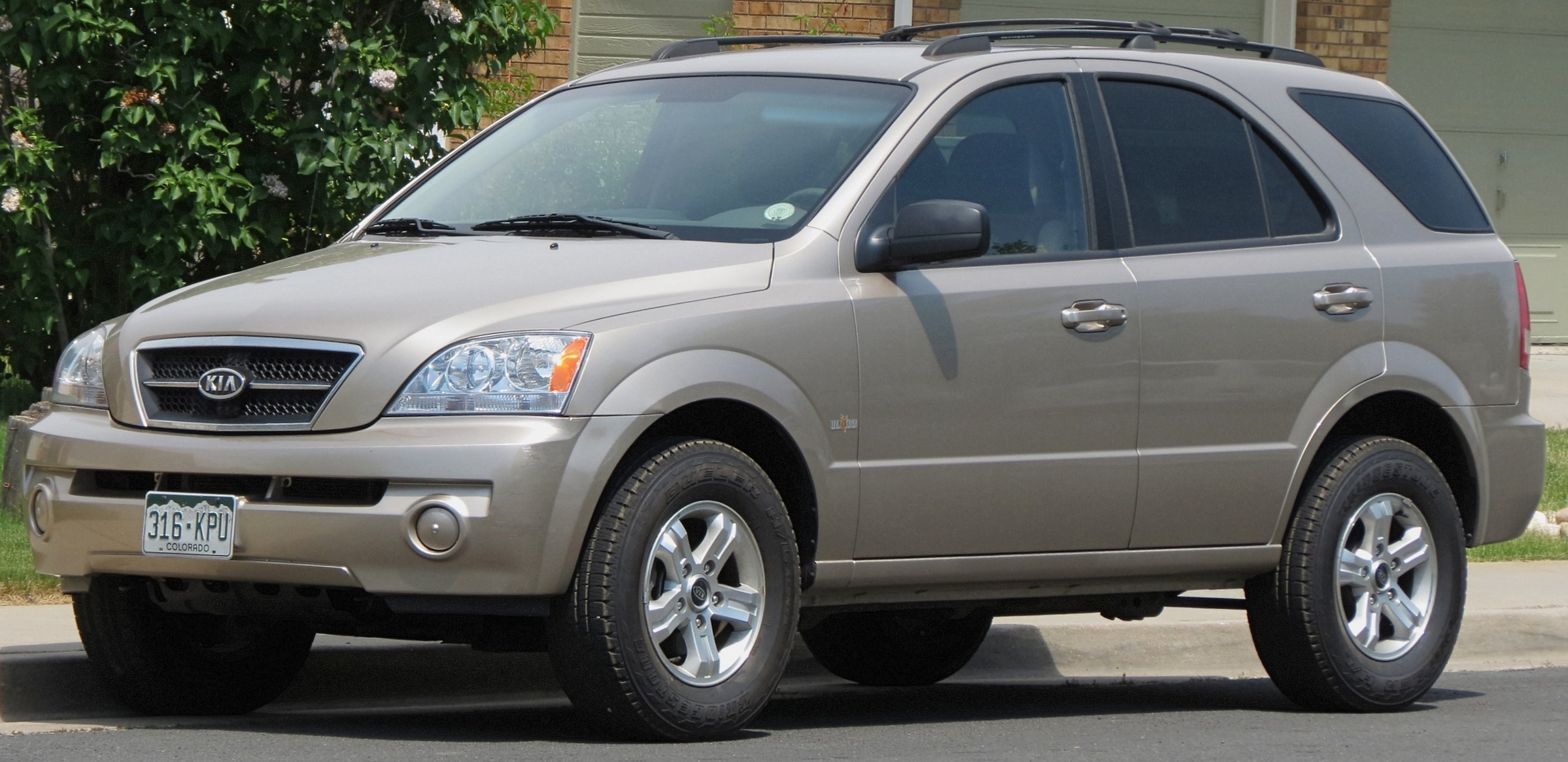
- Pre-facelift Kia Sorento LX (US)

Overview
- Model code: BL
- Also called: Naza Sorento (Malaysia)
- Production: 2002–2011; 2007–2009 (Russia)
- Model years: 2002–2009 (South Korea and Europe); 2003–2009 (North America)
- Assembly: South Korea: Hwaseong (Hwaseong Plant); Malaysia: Gurun (Naza); Russia: Izhevsk (Izh Auto)

Body and chassis
- Layout: Front-engine, rear-wheel-drive; Front-engine, four-wheel-drive
- Chassis: Body-on-frame

Powertrain
- Engine: Petrol: 2.4 L Sirius II I4; 3.3 L Lambda V6; 3.5 L Sigma V6; 3.8 L Lambda V6; Diesel: 2.5 L A I4
- Transmission: 5-speed manual; 4-speed automatic; 5-speed automatic

Dimensions
- Wheelbase: 2,710 mm (106.7 in)
- Length: 4,570–4,590 mm (179.9–180.7 in)
- Width: 1,865–1,885 mm (73.4–74.2 in)
- Height: 1,731–1,810 mm (68.1–71.3 in)

=== 2002–2006 ===
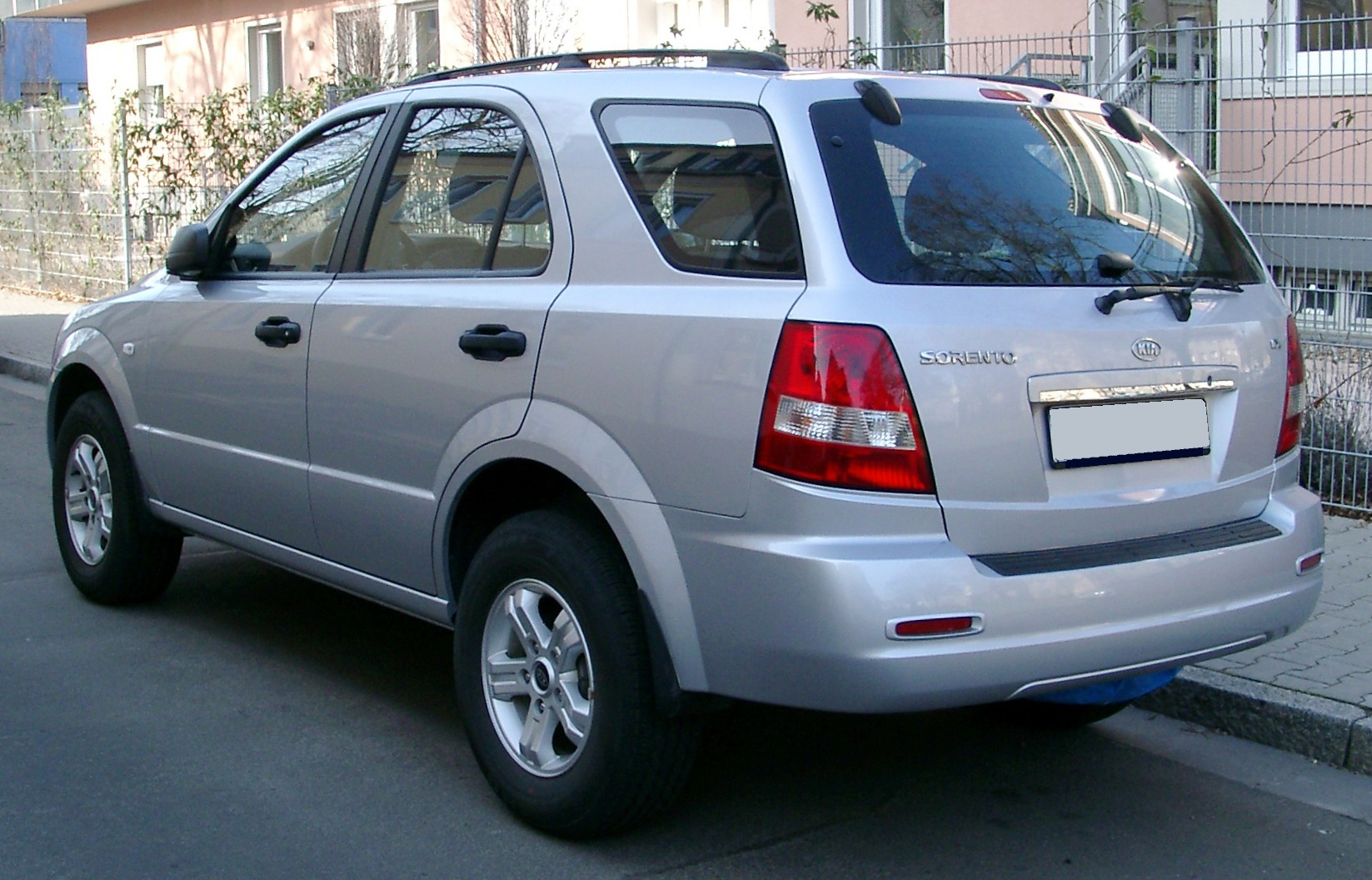
Pre-facelift Kia Sorento LX (Europe)

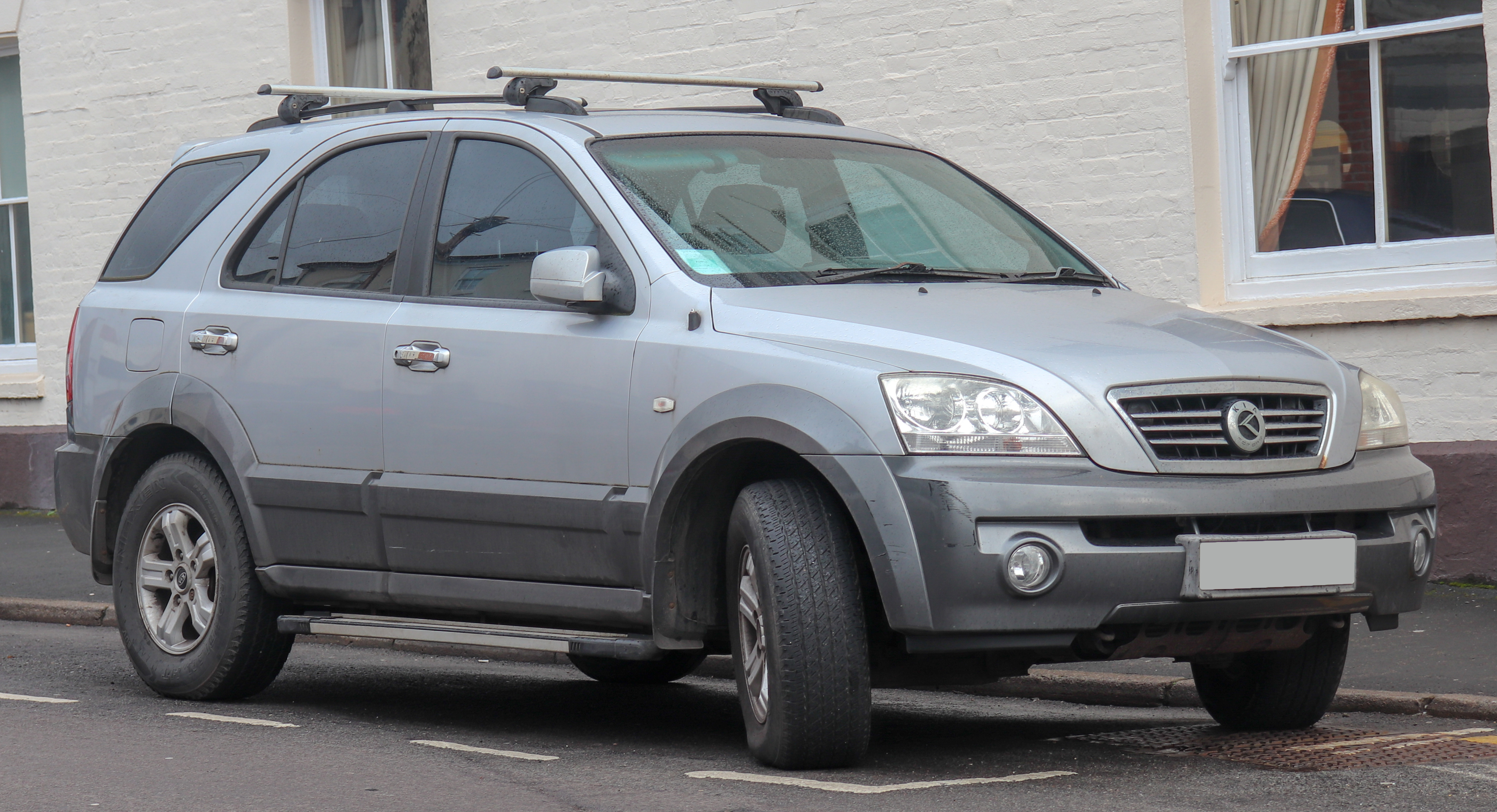

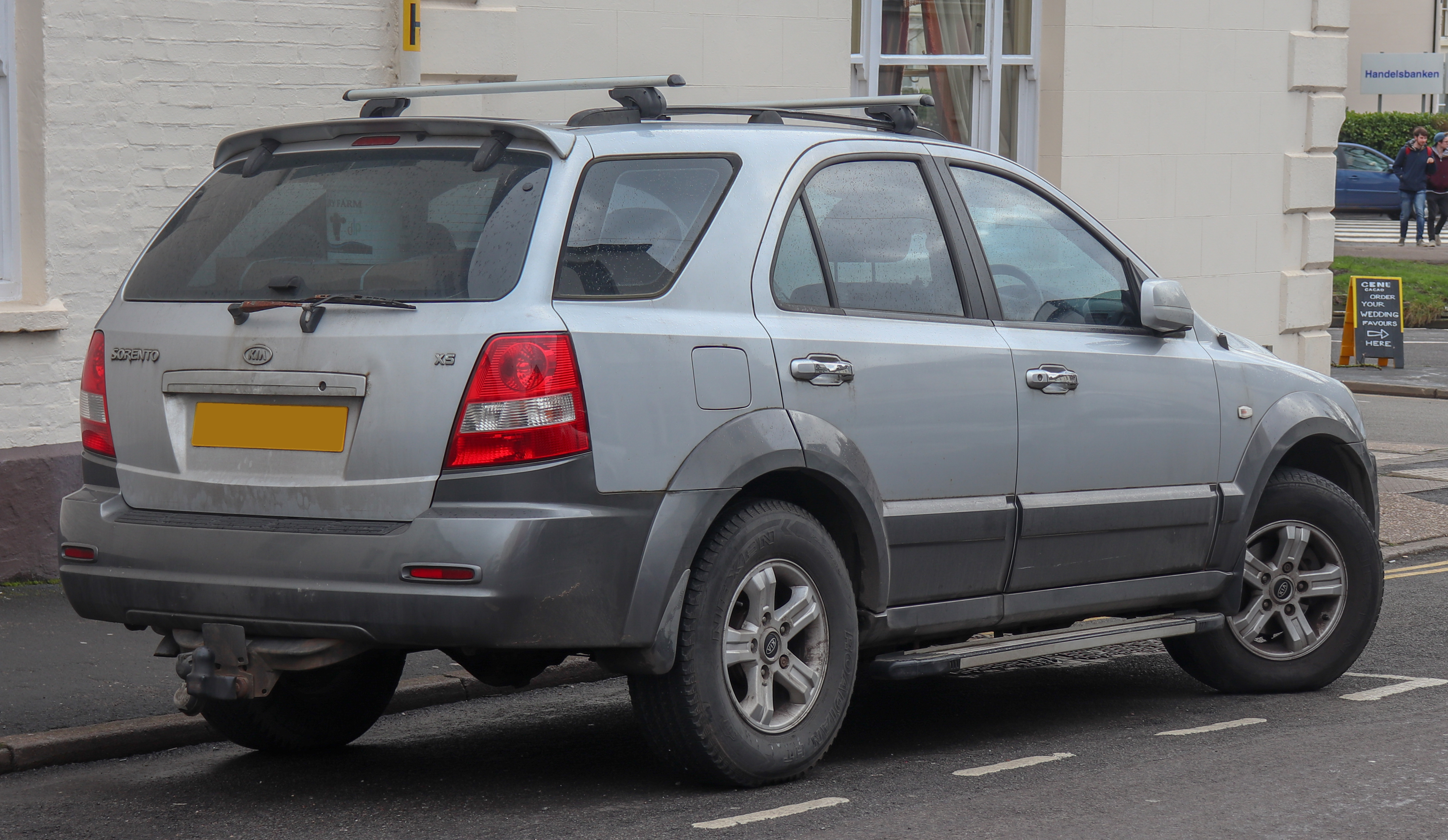
Pre-facelift Kia Sorento XS (UK)

Debuting in late 2001, the first generation Sorento was a traditional truck-based body-on-frame SUV. All US-spec Sorentos also came with dual front airbags and dual side-curtain airbags in the front and rear. An optional four-wheel drive system with low range received praise for adding to the vehicle's off-road ability.

It had two transmission options, a 5-speed manual or 4- and 5-speed automatic (pre-2005 models have a 4-speed automatic, whilst 2005 Sorentos came with a 5-speed tip-tronic style automatic). First generation Sorentos are equipped with a Hyundai-manufactured 3.5-litre 24-valve DOHC V6 engine producing 192 hp (143 kW) at 5500 rpm, and 217 lb⋅ft (294 N⋅m) of torque at 3,000 rpm. Common features of the first generation Sorento were 4-wheel disc brakes (standard on all models), optional anti-lock braking system (ABS), and a 21.1-gallon (79.9 litres) fuel tank.

There were two trim levels available for the Sorento: either the base LX or the up-level EX.

=== 2006 facelift ===
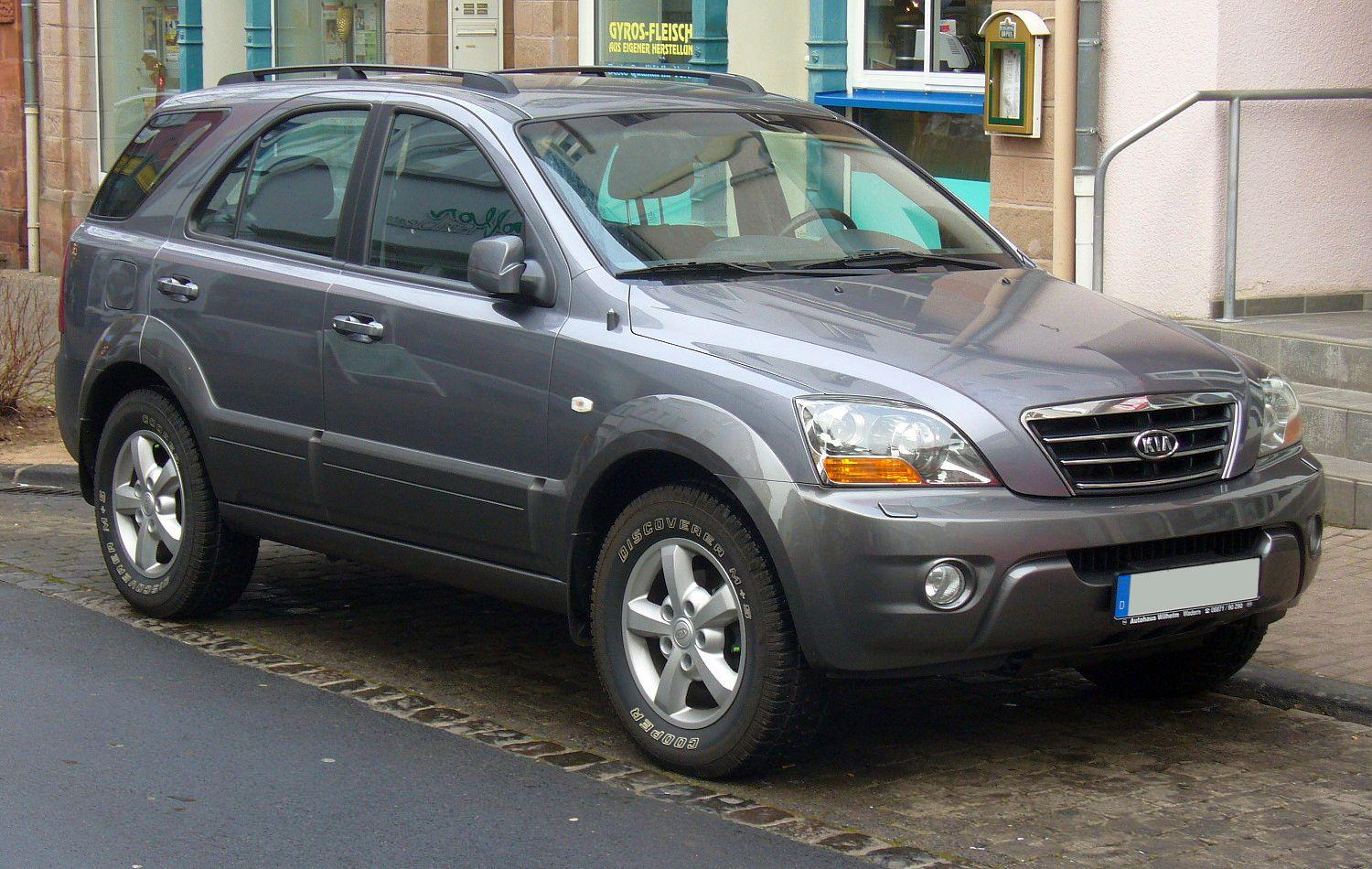

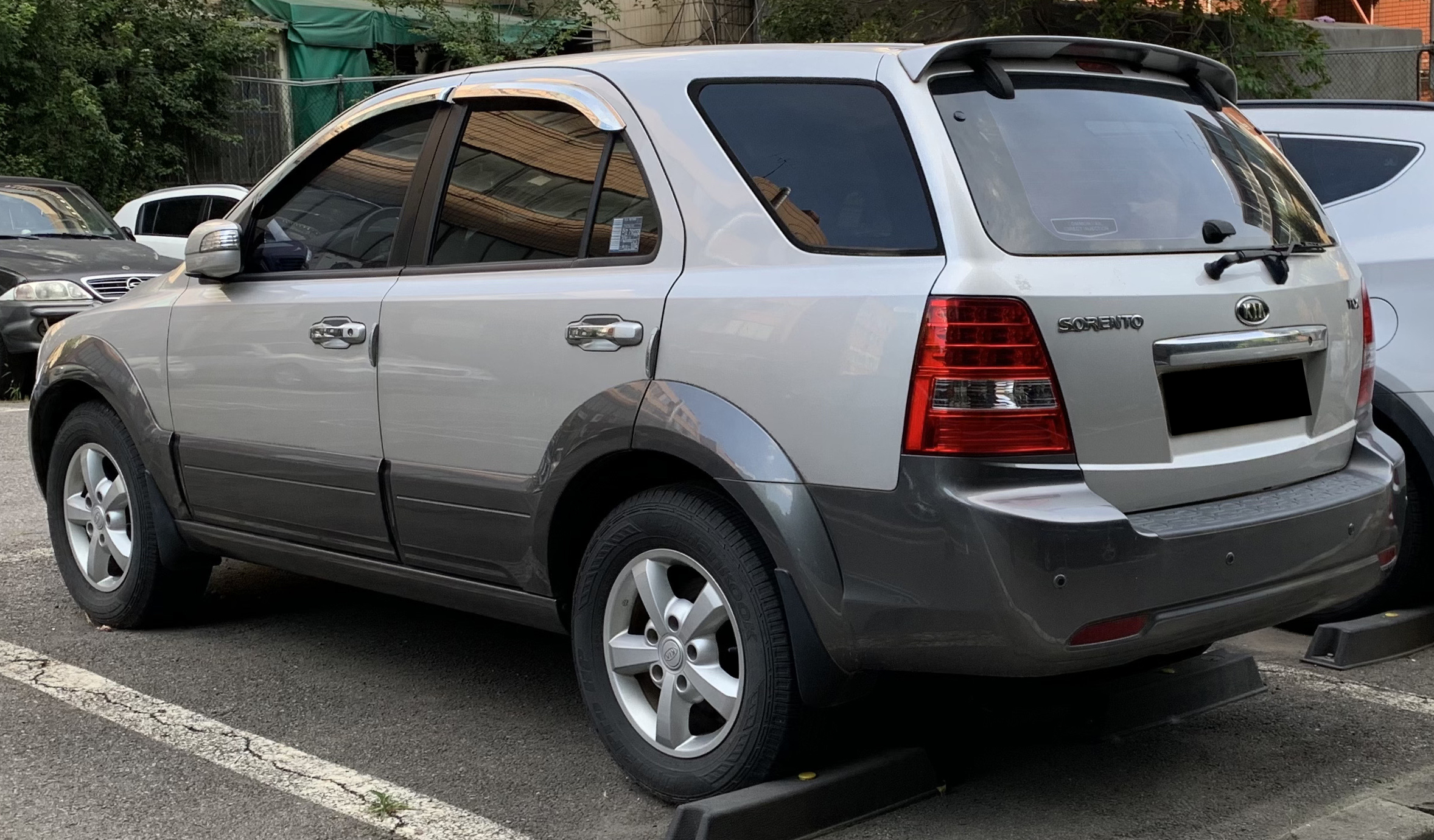
Facelift Kia Sorento

The 2007 Sorento received upgrades, such as the transition from the 3.5-litre Sigma to the 3.3-litre with 235 hp (175 kW) and 226 lb⋅ft (306 N⋅m), and the 3.8-litre Lambda, with 263 hp (196 kW) and 257 lb⋅ft (348 N⋅m) and increased tow capacity from 3,500 lb (1,588 kg) to 5,000 lb (2,268 kg). Projector beam headlamps were added, along with new tail lamps. The 5-speed manual transmission was no longer available; the 5-speed Sportmatic tip-tronic automatic transmission was made standard for all vehicles. Most of the EX trim had full-time AWD and 4x4 Low modes; The LX had a part-time system with 2WD High (rear wheel drive), 4WD High (not for dry pavement) and 4WD Low modes. The 2007 Kia Sorento earned a five-star crash safety rating, the highest rating possible, for all seating positions in frontal and side impact crash tests conducted by the National Highway Traffic Safety Administration (NHTSA). The tail lights and front end were upgraded, but the two-box design stayed.

=== Safety ===
==== Euro NCAP ====
The 2003 Sorento received the following rating:

Euro NCAP test results* Kia Sorento GLS 2.5 diesel (LHD) (2003)
Test	Score	Rating
Adult occupant:	25	4 /5 stars
Pedestrian:	3	1 /4 stars

==== IIHS ====
The 2002 Sorento received Poor to Average ratings from the Insurance Institute for Highway Safety (IIHS). The 2007 facelifted version had improved safety ratings for moderate overlap front crashes and head restraints & seats, but retained its Poor side impact rating.

Test	Rating
Overall:	(2002) (2007)
Moderate overlap front:	Acceptable (2003); Good (2007)
Side:	Poor
Head restraints & seats:	Poor (2003); Good (2007)

==== ANCAP ====
ANCAP test results* Kia Sorento (2008)
Test	Score
Overall	4 /5 stars
Frontal offset	8.52/16
Side impact	16/16
Pole	Not Assessed
Seat belt reminders	0/3
Whiplash protection	Not Assessed
Pedestrian protection	Poor
Electronic stability control	Optional

== Second generation (XM; 2009) ==
Second generation
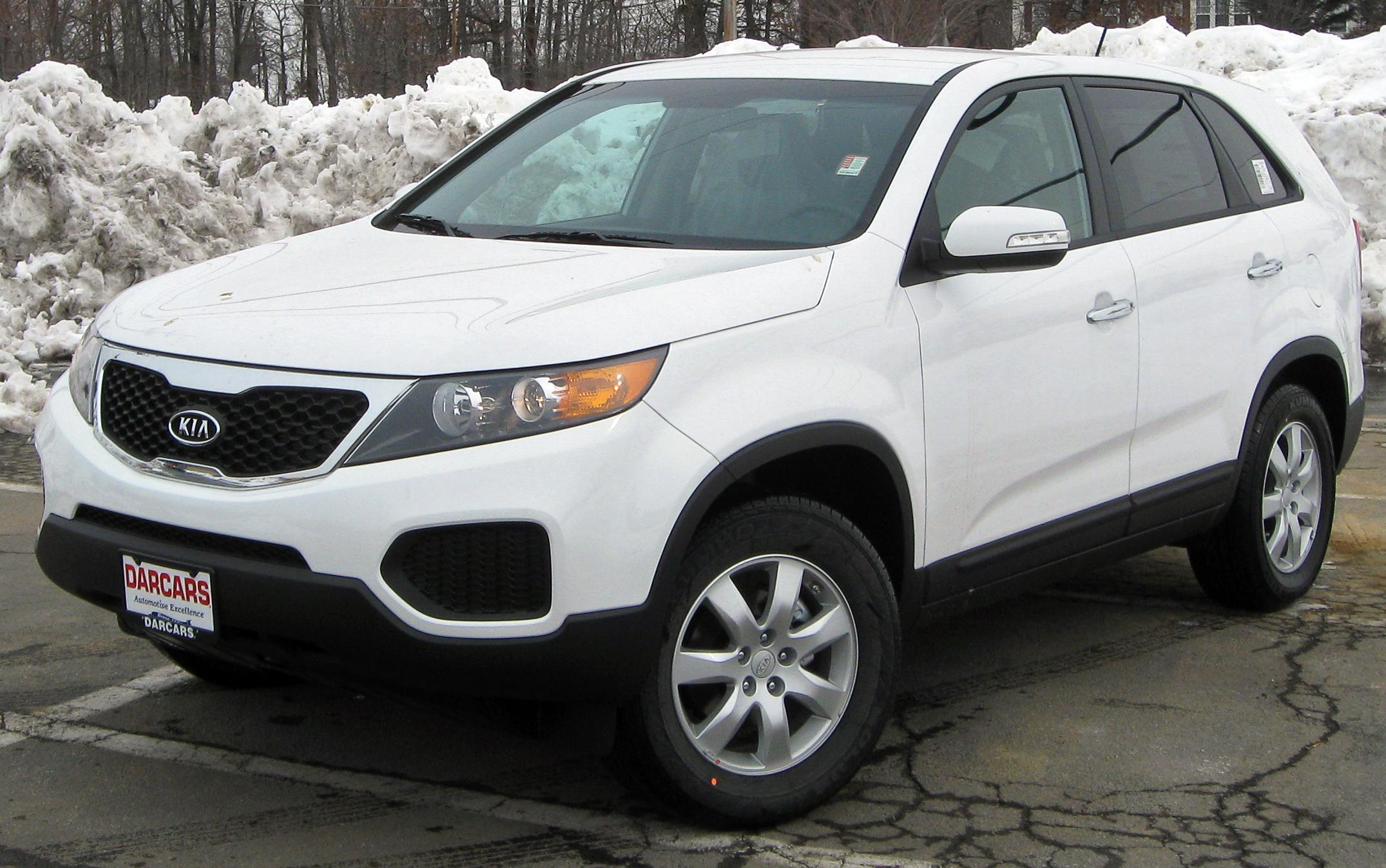
- 2011 Kia Sorento LX (US; pre-facelift)

Overview
- Model code: XM
- Production: 2009–2014; 2009–2021 (Russia)
- Model years: 2010–2014 (South Korea and Europe); 2011–2015 (North America)
- Assembly: South Korea: Hwaseong (Hwaseong Plant); United States: West Point, Georgia (KMMG); Russia: Kaliningrad (Avtotor); Kazakhstan: Oskemen (Azia Avto); Malaysia: Gurun (Naza); Vietnam: Chu Lai (THACO Kia)
- Designer: Peter Schreyer

Body and chassis
- Layout: Front-engine, front-wheel-drive; Front-engine, all-wheel-drive
- Chassis: Unibody
- Related: Hyundai Santa Fe (CM); Hyundai Veracruz/ix55

Powertrain
- Engine: Petrol: 2.4 L Theta II MPi I4; 2.4 L Theta II GDi I4; 3.3 L Lambda II GDI V6; 3.5 L Lambda II MPi V6; Petrol/LPG: 2.7 L Mu V6; Diesel: 2.0 L R II CRDi I4; 2.2 L R II CRDi I4
- Transmission: 5-speed manual; 6-speed manual; 5-speed automatic; 6-speed automatic

Dimensions
- Wheelbase: 2,700 mm (106.3 in)
- Length: 4,660–4,684 mm (183.5–184.4 in)
- Width: 1,885 mm (74.2 in)
- Height: 1,710 mm (67.3 in)

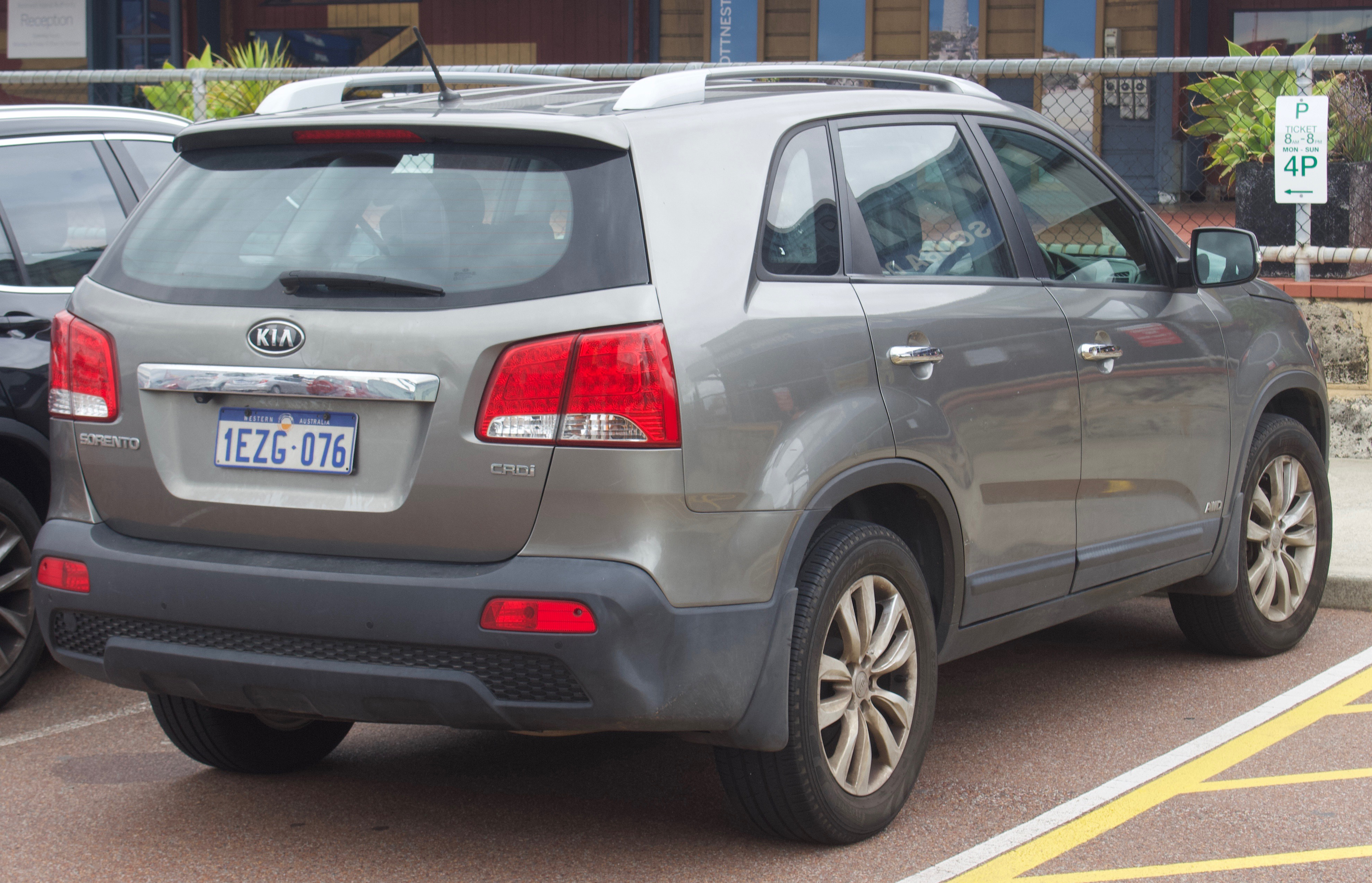
Pre-facelift

A redesigned Sorento (codename XM) was launched in South Korea in April 2009. The second generation was Kia's first model to be manufactured in the United States, in Kia's new US$1 billion West Point, Georgia, factory (which also builds the sister vehicle to the Sorento, the Hyundai Santa Fe). The second generation used Kia's corporate Tiger Nose grille, and was the first Kia vehicle to offer Kia UVO. Furthermore, unlike its body-on-frame predecessor, the new Sorento adopted a unibody platform with fully independent suspension. The vice president of marketing for Kia Motors America said that Kia initially considered changing the name due to the radical change in the Sorento's body style. The 2010 model year ended up being skipped, since the 2011 model year released early.

The second-generation Sorento introduced Kia's new design language, and introduced new features and technology that would later become available on other Kia models.

The four-cylinder model returned to the lineup for North American models after being absent between 2007 and 2010. The engine was transverse, and the suspension all-independent. The change in body construction as well as the loss of a low-ratio transfer case made the Sorento 475 pounds less than the old one model for model, to gain in performance and economy.

The second generation Sorento was originally available in four models – the Base, LX, EX and top-of-the-line SX models. The SX is only available with the 3.5-litre 276 hp (206 kW) V6. The Base and LX both come standard with the 2.4-litre straight-4 175 hp (130 kW) and EX has the GDI version of the same engine which is rated 191 hp. The V6 is available as an upgrade for both the LX and EX. The SX Limited model became available in 2012.

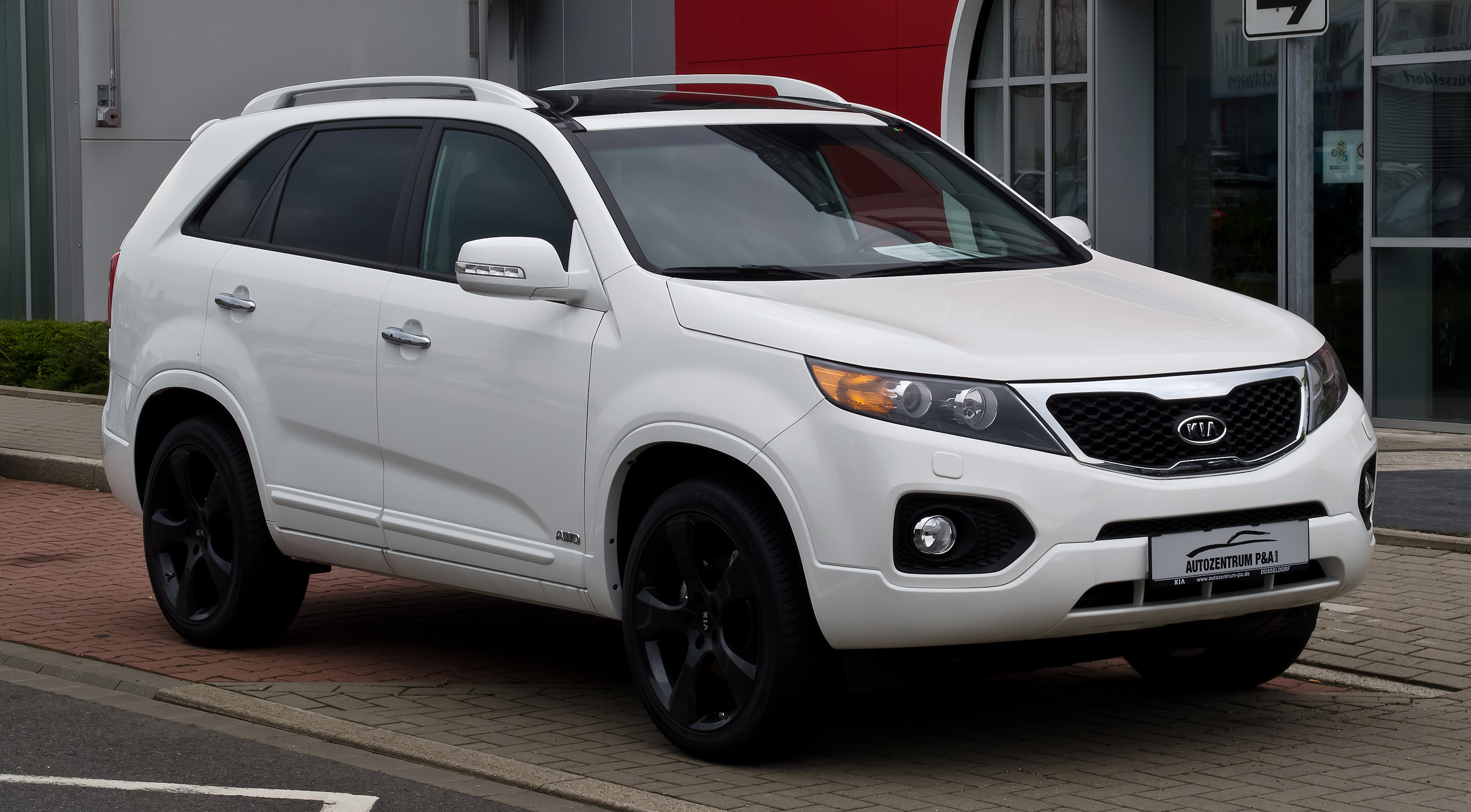
Kia Sorento Spirit (Germany; pre-facelift)

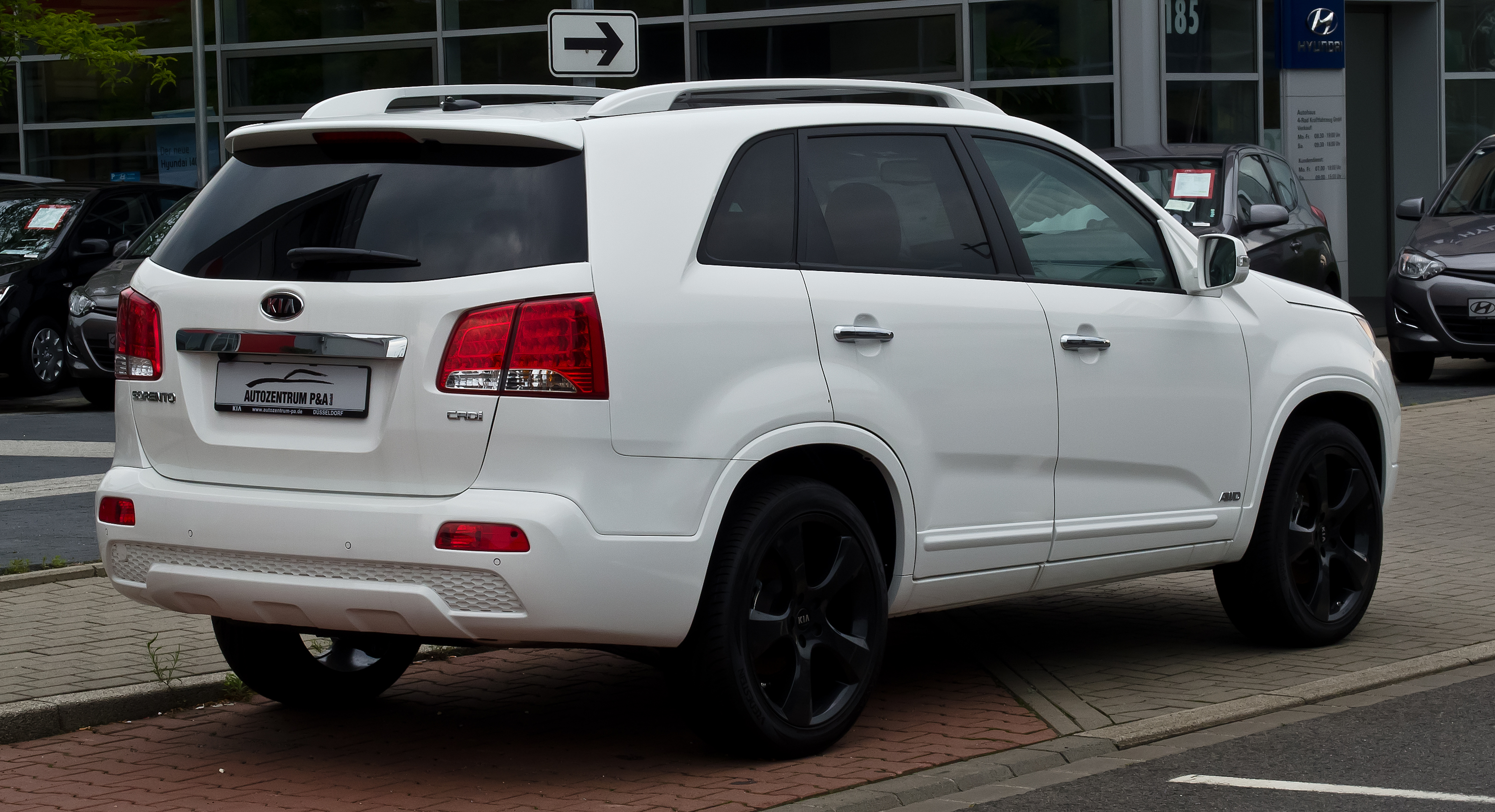
Kia Sorento Spirit (Germany; pre-facelift)

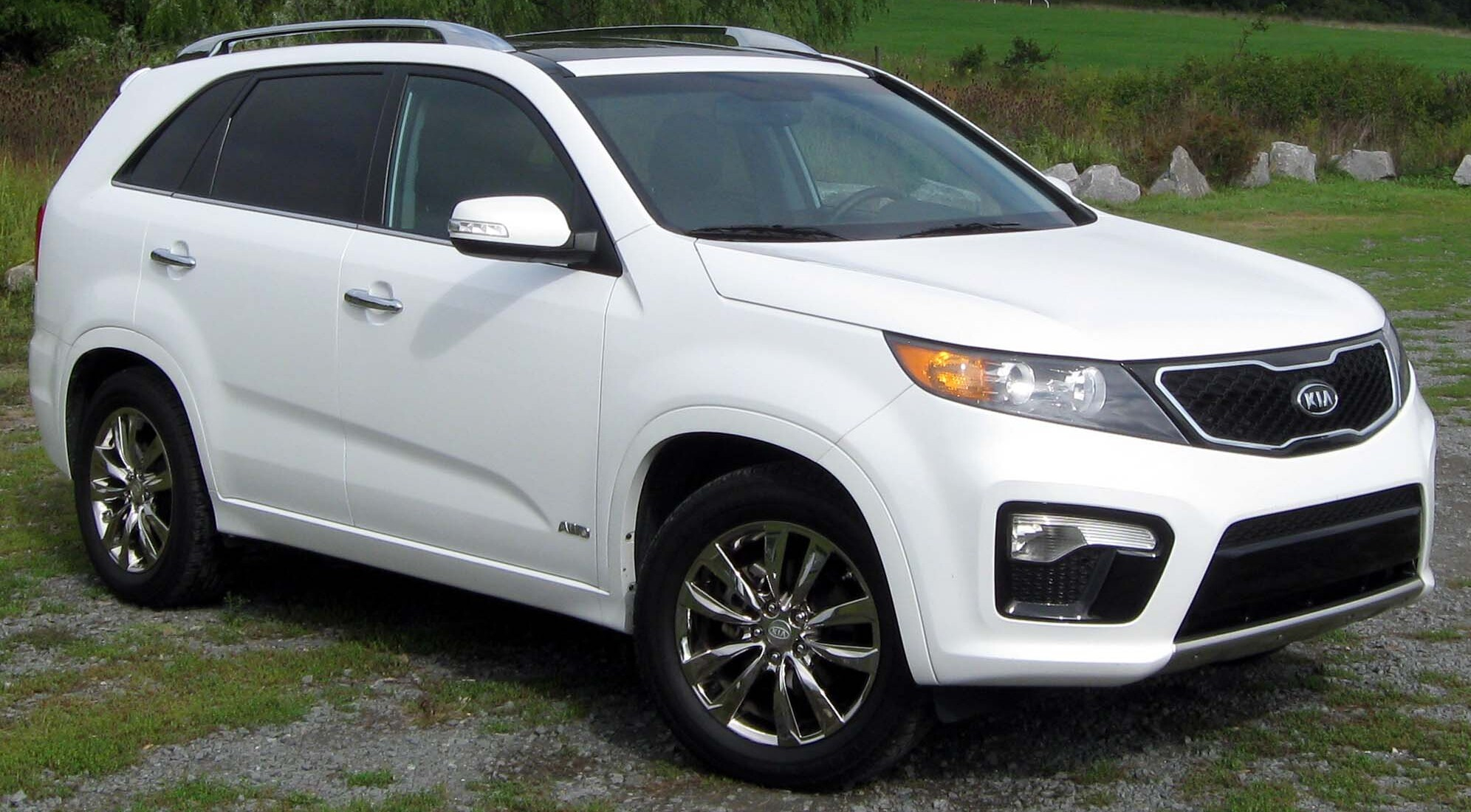
2011 Kia Sorento SX (US; pre-facelift)

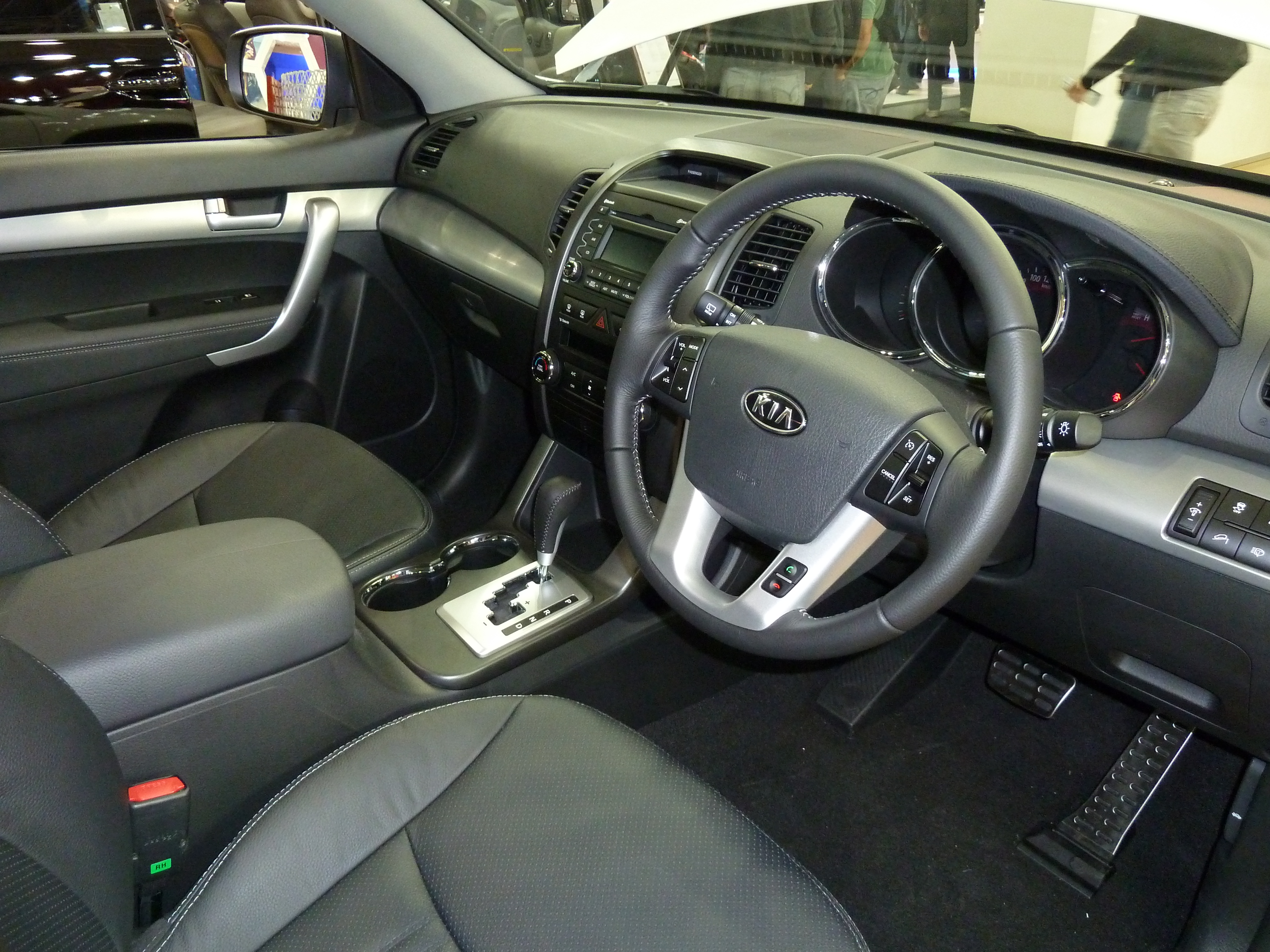
Interior (pre-facelift)

=== 2012 facelift ===
The Sorento received a mid-cycle refresh for the 2014 model year, unveiled in 2012 at the Los Angeles International Auto Show, and went on sale in first quarter of 2013. Major changes included a revised instrument panel, front and rear end with new tail lights modeled after the Optima, as well as several other mechanical and interior changes.

For 2015, the six-speed manual transmission option, previously only available on the Base and LX models, was discontinued, leaving the six-speed automatic transmission as the only transmission option for the Sorento.

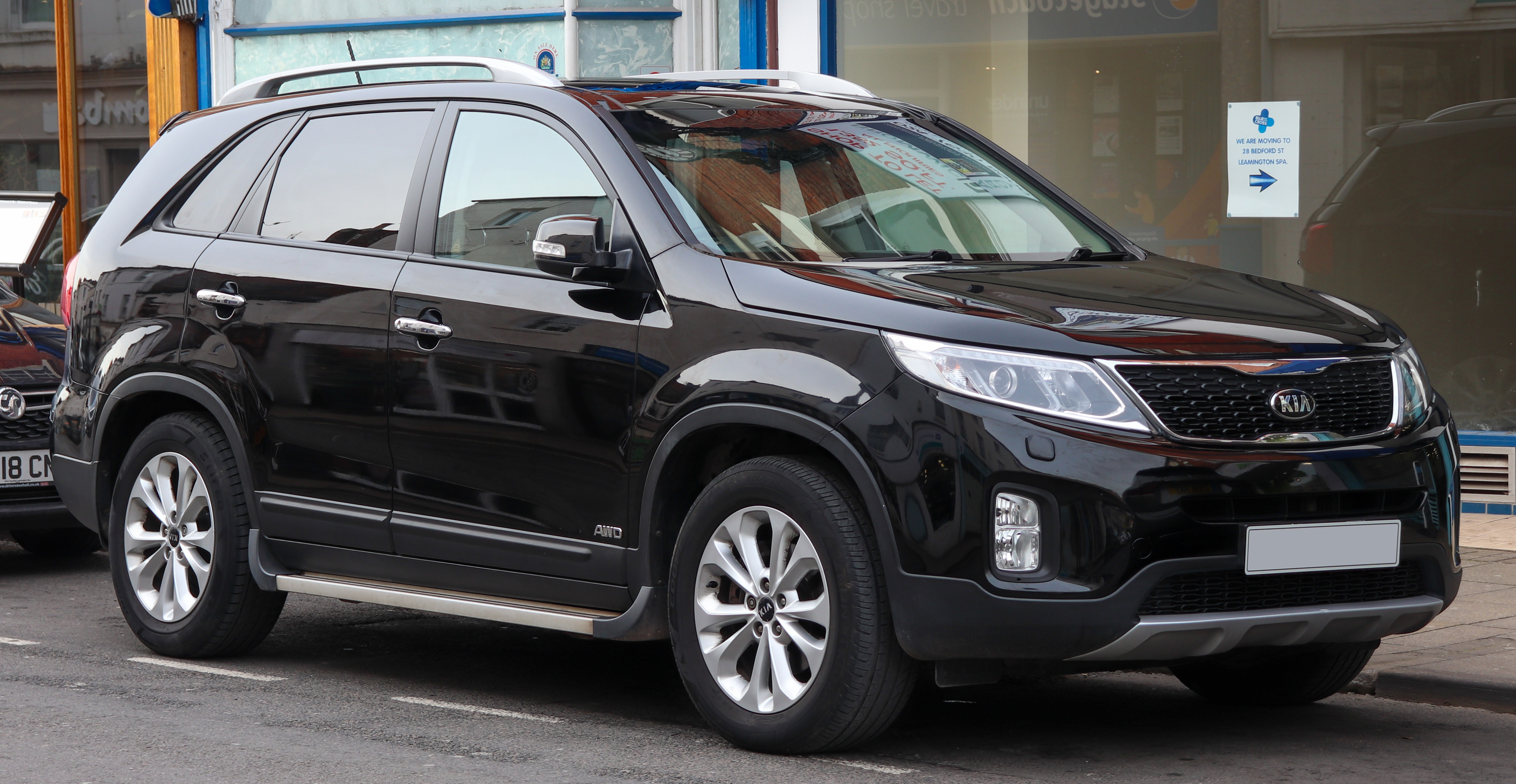
2015 Kia Sorento KX-3 (UK; facelift)

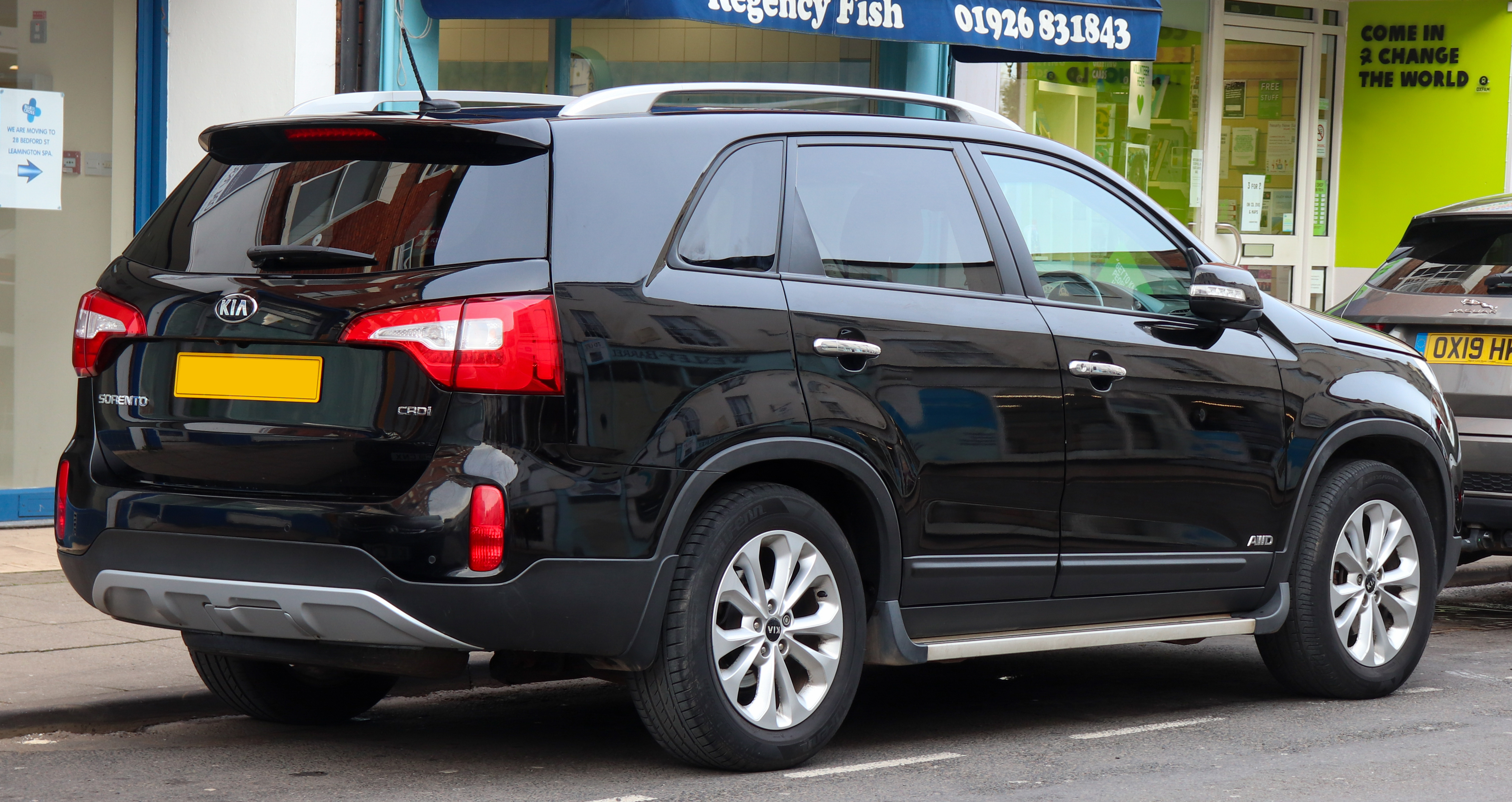
2015 Kia Sorento KX-3 (UK; facelift)

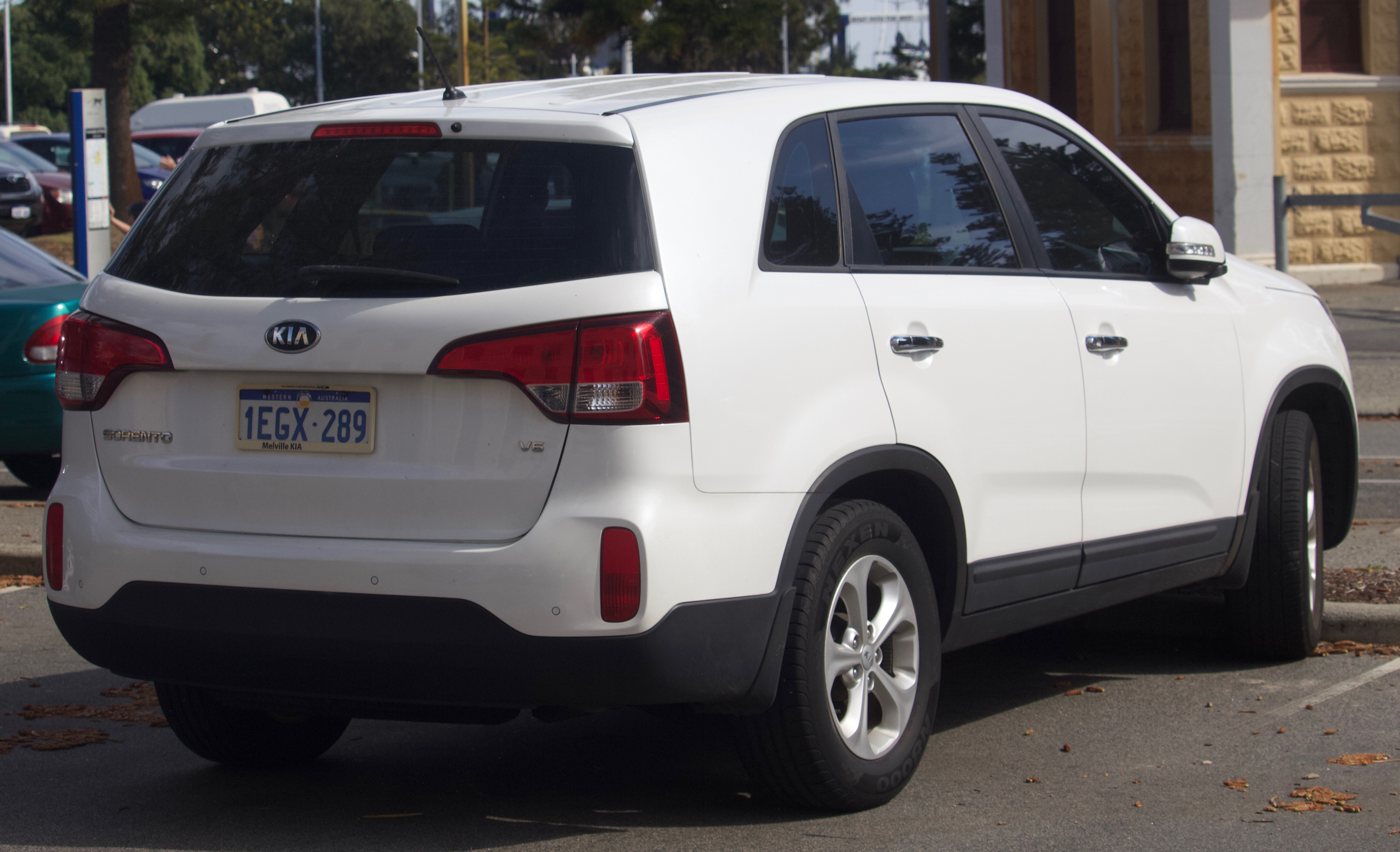
2013 Kia Sorento Si (Australia; facelift)

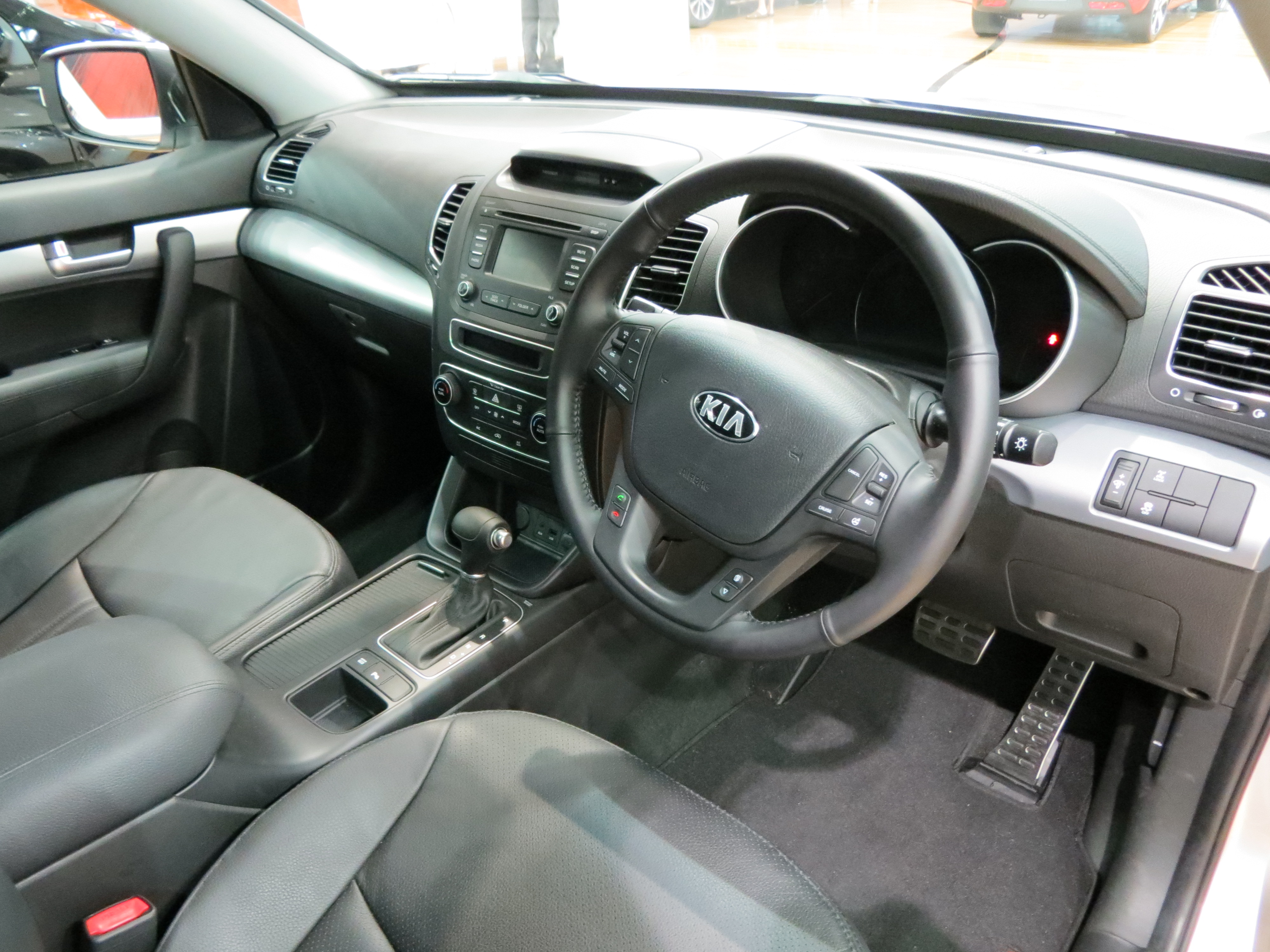
Interior (facelift)

=== Safety ===
==== Euro NCAP ====
Euro NCAP test results* Kia Sorento 2.2 diesel GLS (EX) (LHD) (2009)
Test	Points	%
Overall:	5 /5 stars	
Adult occupant:	31.2	87%
Child occupant:	41	84%
Pedestrian:	15.9	44%
Safety assist:	5	71%

==== IIHS ====
The 2011 Sorento received a "Top Safety Pick" rating from the Insurance Institute for Highway Safety (IIHS).

Test	Rating
Overall:	5/5 stars
Moderate overlap front:	Good
Side:	Good
Roof strength:	Good
Head restraints & seats:	Good

==== ANCAP ====
ANCAP test results* Kia Sorento 4x4 diesel variants with passenger seat belt reminder and dual pretensioner (driver seat) (2010)
Test	Score
Overall	5 /5 stars
Frontal offset	13.25/16
Side impact	15.96/16
Pole	2/2
Seat belt reminders	2/3
Whiplash protection	Not Assessed
Pedestrian protection	Marginal
Electronic stability control	Standard

ANCAP test results* Kia Sorento 2.2L diesel AWD variants (2011)
Test	Score
Overall	5 /5 stars
Frontal offset	13.25/16
Side impact	15.96/16
Pole	2/2
Seat belt reminders	2/3
Whiplash protection	Not Assessed
Pedestrian protection	Marginal
Electronic stability control	Standard

=== Awards ===
The 2011 Sorento was awarded the maximum five-star safety rating from the crash safety experts, European New Car Assessment Programme (Euro NCAP) and Australasian New Car Assessment Program (ANCAP). The XM Sorento awarded 'Top Safety Pick' from Insurance Institute for Highway Safety (IIHS) in the United States.

The second generation Sorento was awarded New Zealand Autocar magazine SUV of the Year, "great looker, does absolutely everything as it should. Engine is world class". The Kia Sorento EX V6 model earned an "Excellent" overall score by American magazine Consumer Reports’ July 2010 issue.

=== Marketing ===
As part of 2014 Sorento market launch in the US, a campaign titled "It has an answer for everything" was unveiled during Super Bowl XLVII. "Space Babies" (directed by Jake Scott) commercial was premiered in the fourth quarter, featuring the existence of a faraway planet known as "Babylandia" and follows infant boys, girls, dogs, pandas and more on their journey to Earth to join their new families. After taking it all in, the curious child begins to offer an alternative theory passed on by a friend but his quick-thinking father calls upon UVO's voice-activated jukebox feature to hurriedly change the subject and survive another day in the adventures of parenthood. "Tight Space" (directed by Peter Darley Miller and Colin Jeffery) showed two of the CUV's available features – power-folding mirrors and power liftgate – help a determined father make the slimmest parking garage space manageable while his skeptical wife and children look on.

== Third generation (UM; 2014) ==
Third generation
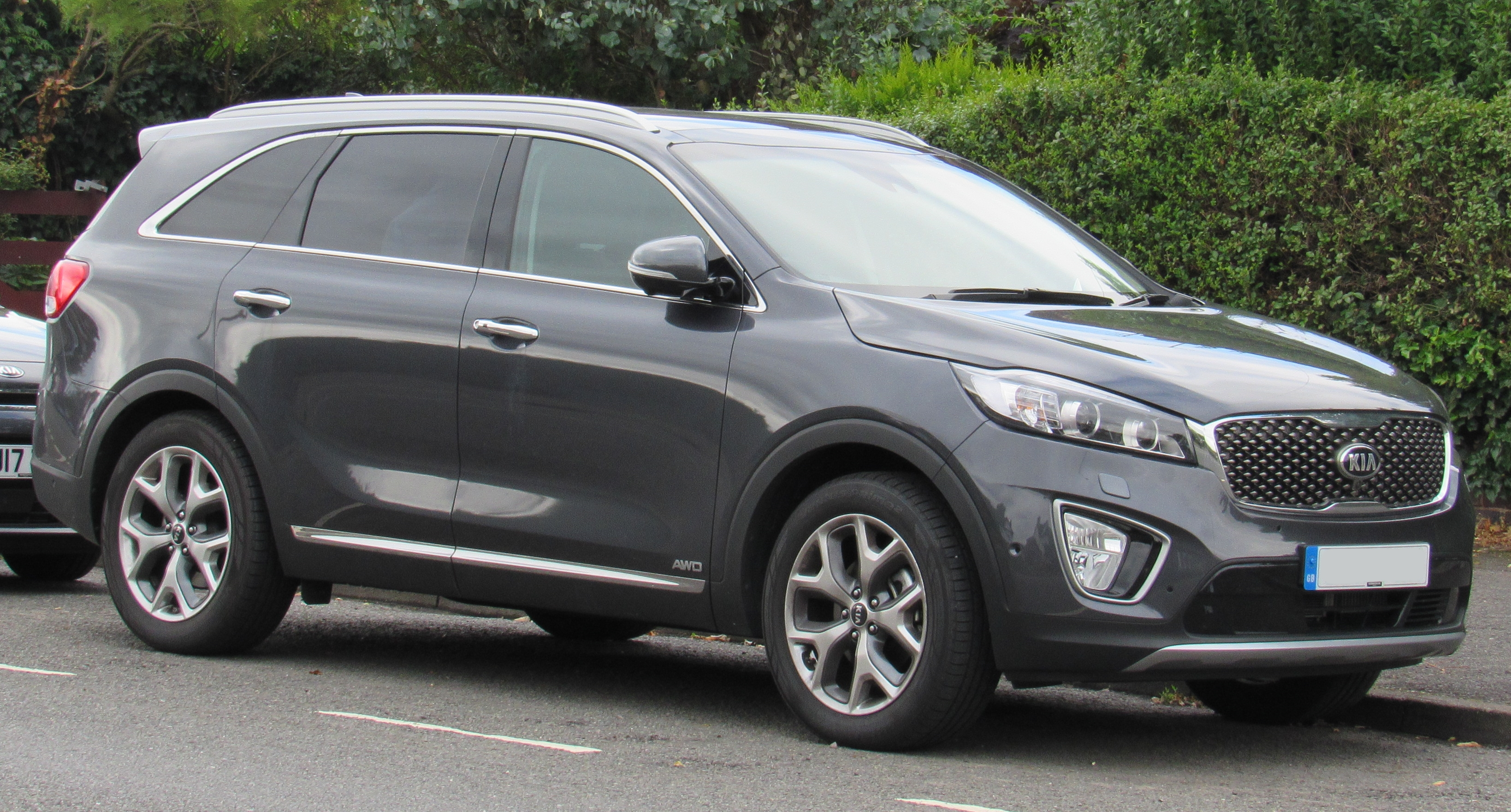
- 2017 Kia Sorento KX-4 (UK; pre-facelift)

Overview
- Model code: UM
- Also called: Kia Sorento Sport SWB (South Korea)
- Production: 2014–2020; 2021–2025 (Pakistan)
- Model years: 2015–2020 (South Korea and Europe); 2016–2020 (North America)
- Assembly: South Korea: Hwaseong (Hwaseong Plant); United States: West Point, Georgia (KMMG); Malaysia: Gurun (Naza); Russia: Kaliningrad (Avtotor); Algeria: Batna (GLOVIZ); Pakistan: Karachi (Lucky Motor Corporation)
- Designer: Yun Seok Oh and Ji Hyeong Kim; Seo Hee Ahn (facelift)

Body and chassis
- Layout: Front-engine, front-wheel-drive; Front-engine, all-wheel-drive
- Chassis: Unibody
- Related: Hyundai Sonata (LF); Hyundai Santa Fe (DM/NC); Kia Carnival/Sedona (YP)

Powertrain
- Engine: Petrol: 2.0 L Theta II T-GDi I4; 2.4 L Theta II MPi I4; 2.4 L Theta II GDi I4; 3.3 L Lambda II MPi V6; 3.3 L Lambda II GDi V6; 3.5 L Lambda II MPi V6; Diesel: 2.0 L R II CRDi I4; 2.2 L R II CRDi I4
- Transmission: 6-speed manual; 6-speed automatic; 8-speed automatic

Dimensions
- Wheelbase: 2,780 mm (109.4 in)
- Length: 4,760–4,800 mm (187.4–189.0 in)
- Width: 1,890 mm (74.4 in)
- Height: 1,685–1,690 mm (66.3–66.5 in)
- Curb weight: 1,680–1,970 kg (3,704–4,343 lb)

Kia revealed the third generation Sorento in South Korea on 28 August 2014. The vehicle later made its European debut at the 2014 Paris Motor Show. The third generation Sorento shares a platform with the third-generation Kia Carnival, and is available in either 5-seater or 7-seater, depending on configuration. It is 95mm longer than the previous generation, but lower for better handling. Kia claims a rigidity strengthening of 14% on its high tensile steel and the Sorento scored good evaluation in small overlap crash test by IIHS. In the US, the Sorento continues to be produced at the West Point, Georgia assembly plant.

Available engines are a 290 hp (294 PS; 216 kW) 3.3-litre Lambda II V6, the existing 190 hp (193 PS; 142 kW) 2.4-litre GDi I4 that make the same output as the outgoing engine, and the new 240 hp (243 PS; 179 kW) 2.0-litre turbo I4. A 2.2-litre CRDi diesel engine with variable geometry turbocharger (VGT) is also available.

The third generation Sorento comes equipped with a six-speed manual transmission or six-speed automatic transmission. Drivetrains are front-wheel drive or all-wheel drive.

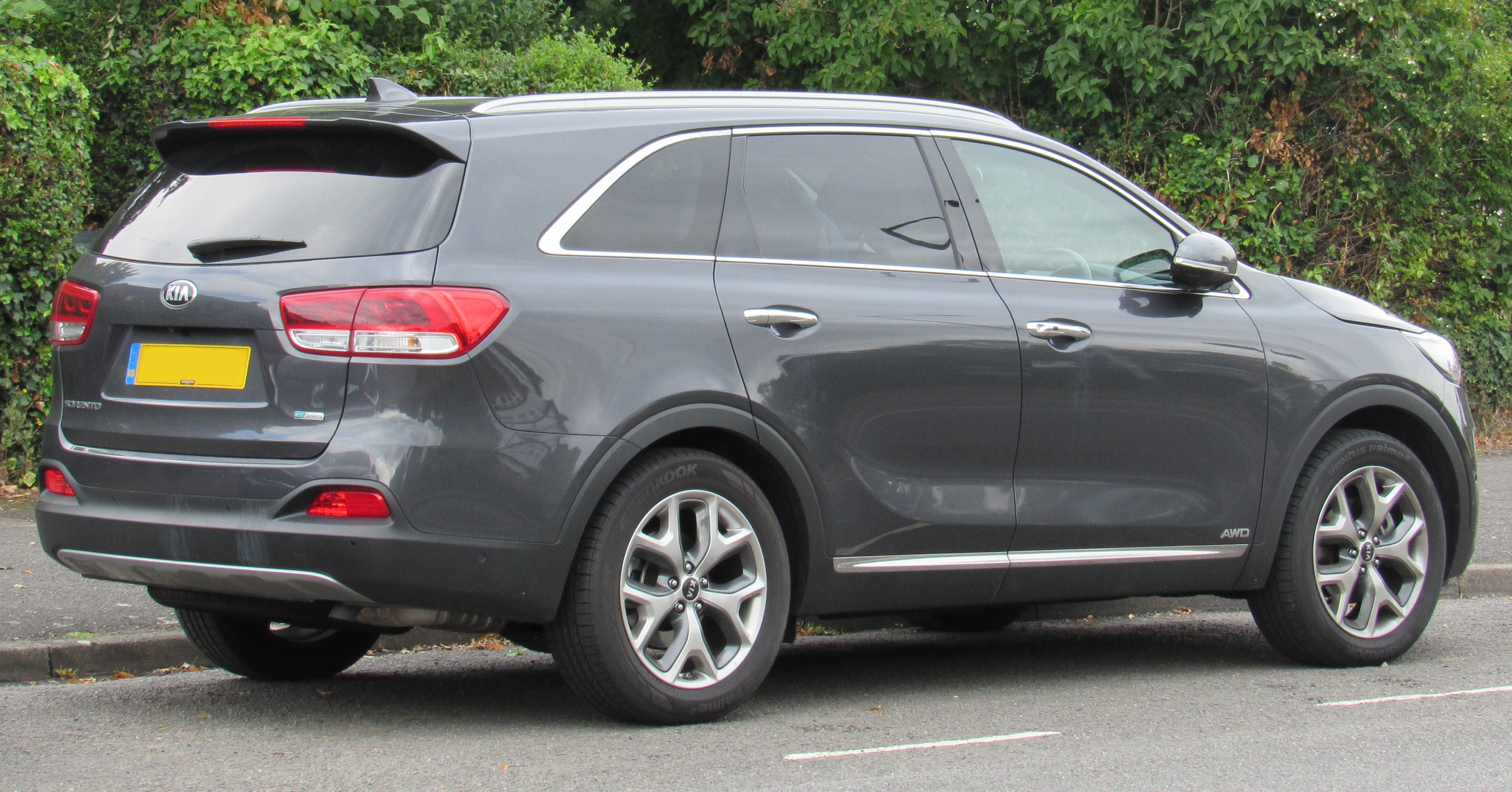
Rear view

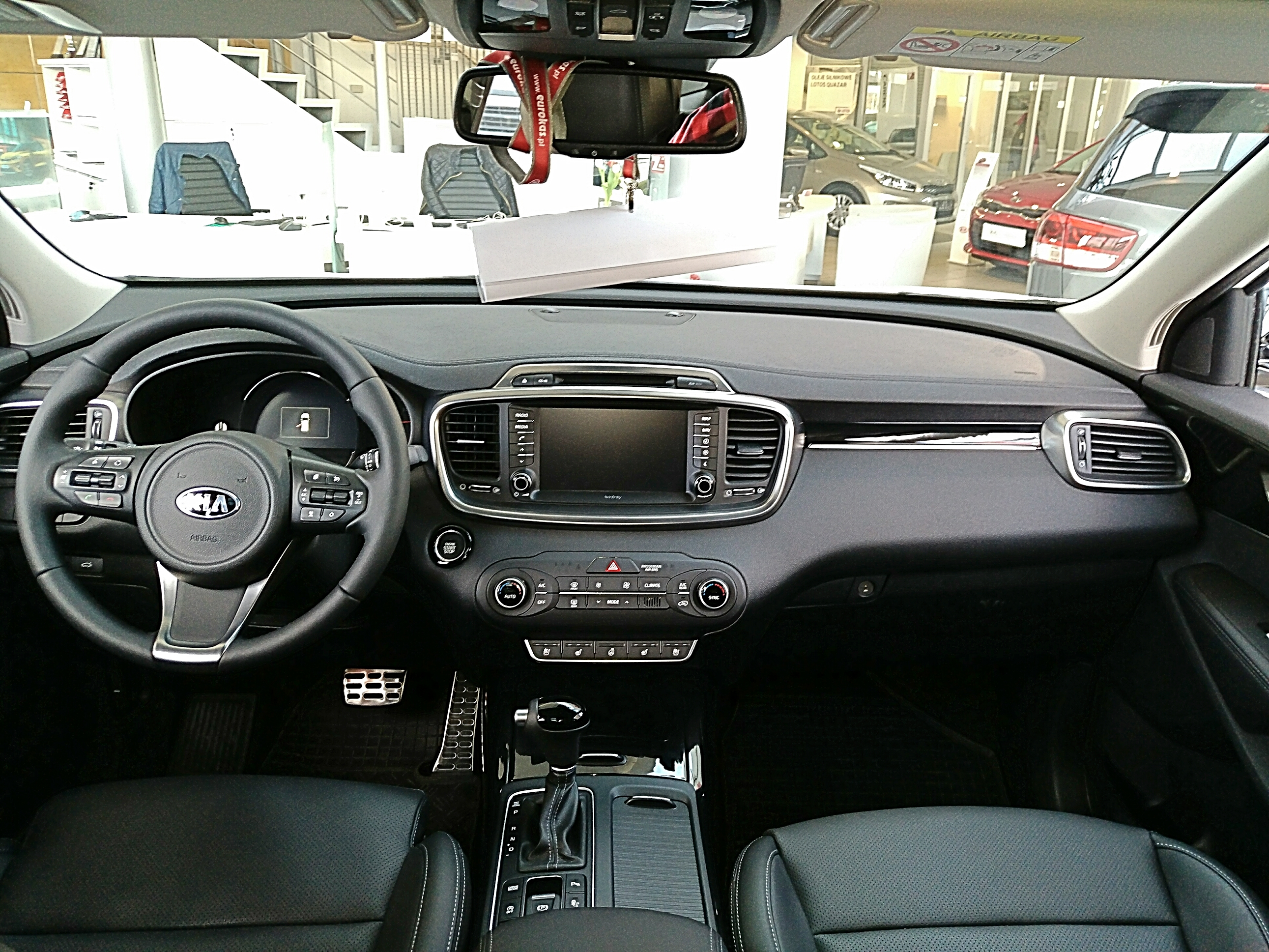
Interior

=== 2017 facelift ===
In 2017, the Kia Sorento received updates for 2018 or 2019 depending on market location, these included a new front grille, bumper covers and exterior lighting with similar design cues derived from the 2019 Kia Forte and the 2018 Kia Cadenza for the 2019 model year. The L, LX, EX and SX trim levels received refreshed projector beam headlamps with LED positioning lights. The SXL trim received new LED headlamps with LED daytime running lights, LED amber turn signal and positioning lights, and LED tail lamps.

Other changes include new exterior colours, new wheels, third row seating became standard on all trim levels with all engine types, driver attention warning system added to all trim levels, and a 2.4-litre engine replaced the 2.0-litre engine on lower trim levels. The 2019 Kia Sorento features a 3.3-litre V6 engine on higher trim levels. The trim levels are available with all-wheel drive, except for the base L trim, which is only available with front-wheel drive.

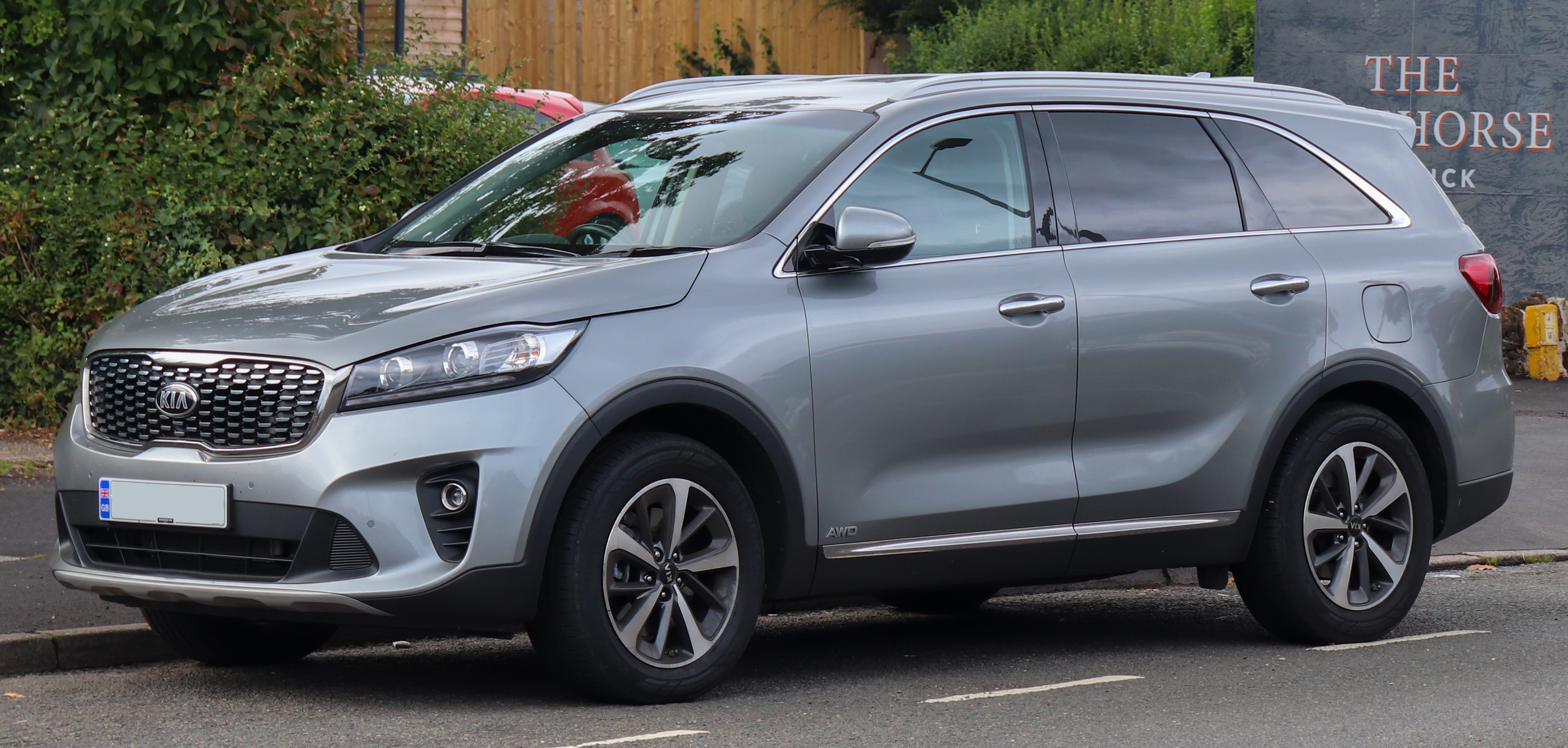
Kia Sorento (facelift)

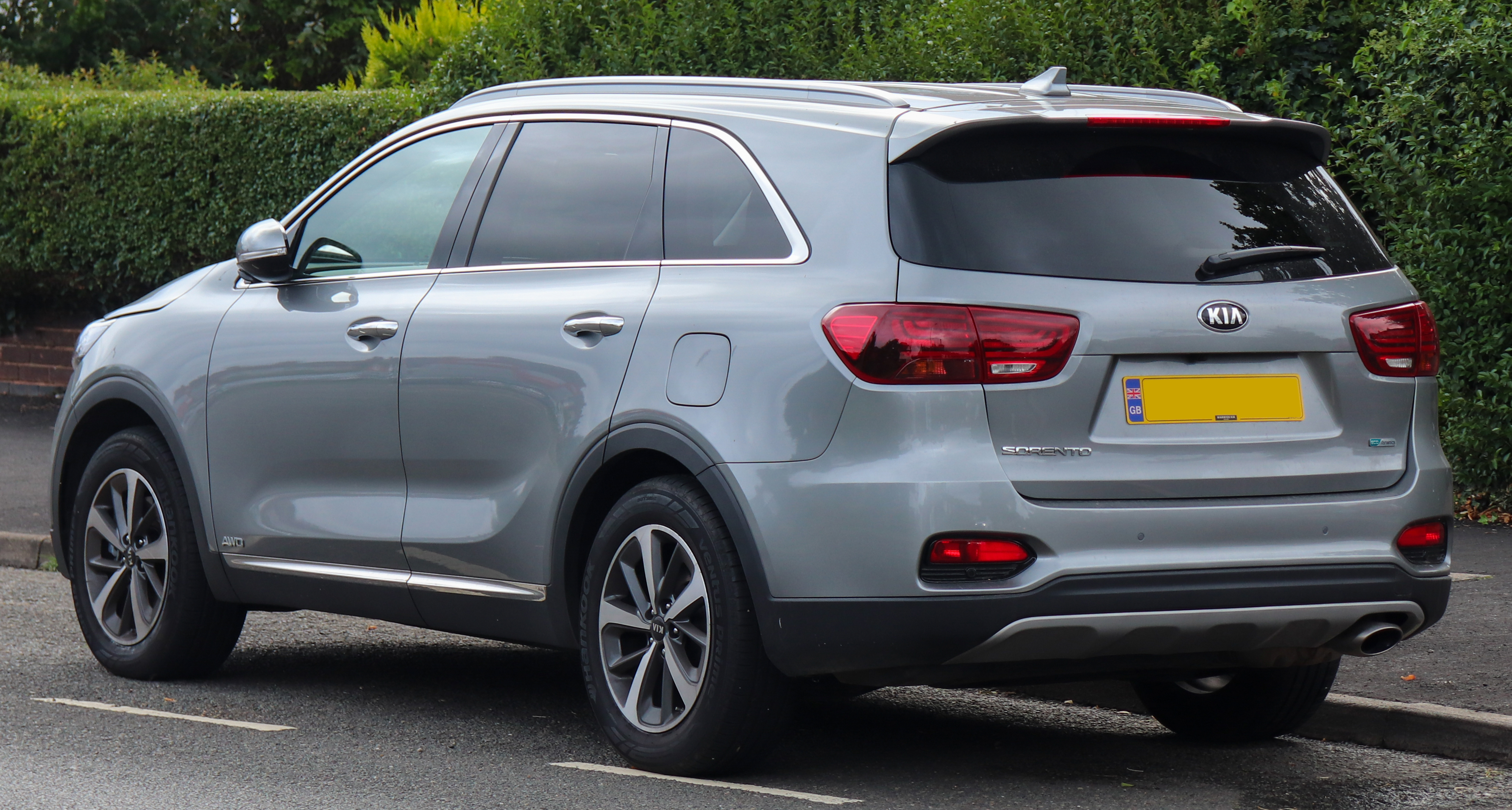
Rear view

=== Markets ===
==== North America ====
In the United States, the 2016 Kia Sorento is offered in five models, and four models within the United Kingdom. KX-1 base model, KX-2, KX-3 and KX-4 with the GT-Line from late 2018 onwards replacing the KX-4.

==== Pakistan ====
In Pakistan, Kia Pakistan launched the facelifted third-generation Sorento as a locally assembled model at a Power Play event held at the Karachi factory on 14 February 2021. The event was held at Lucky Motor Corporation's production plant, where various personalities from the automotive sector were invited. The SUV is offered in three trim levels: 2.4 L FWD, 2.4 L AWD and 3.5 L FWD. The two 2.4 L trim levels come with the 2.4 L Theta II MPi I4 engine and 6-speed automatic transmission while the 3.5 L trim comes with the 3.5 L Lambda II MPi V6 engine and 8-speed automatic transmission.

=== Safety ===
==== Euro NCAP ====
Euro NCAP test results* Kia Sorento 2.2 diesel GLS (LHD) (2014)
Test	Points	%
Overall:	5 /5 stars	
Adult occupant:	34.2	90%
Child occupant:	41	83%
Pedestrian:	24.2	67%
Safety assist:	9.3	71%

==== IIHS ====
The 2017 Sorento received a "Top Safety Pick" rating from the Insurance Institute for Highway Safety (IIHS).

Test	Rating
Overall:	5/5 stars
Small overlap front:	Good
Moderate overlap front:	Good
Side:	Good
Roof strength:	Good
Head restraints & seats:	Good
Front crash prevention:	Superior
Headlights:	Poor/Good varying with trim level
Child seat anchors (Latch) ease of use:	Acceptable

==== ANCAP ====
ANCAP test results* Kia Sorento all variants (2015)
Test	Score
Overall	5 /5 stars
Frontal offset	15.62/16
Side impact	16/16
Pole	2/2
Seat belt reminders	3/3
Whiplash protection	Good
Pedestrian protection	Adequate
Electronic stability control	Standard

ANCAP test results* Kia Sorento all New Zealand variants (2017)
Test	Score
Overall	5 /5 stars
Frontal offset	15.62/16
Side impact	16/16
Pole	2/2
Seat belt reminders	3/3
Whiplash protection	Good
Pedestrian protection	Adequate
Electronic stability control	Standard

ANCAP test results* Kia Sorento all Australian variants (2017)
Test	Score
Overall	5 /5 stars
Frontal offset	15.62/16
Side impact	16/16
Pole	2/2
Seat belt reminders	3/3
Whiplash protection	Good
Pedestrian protection	Adequate
Electronic stability control	Standard

=== Marketing ===
In November 2014, Kia collaborated with 20th Century Fox to create a Wolverine-themed Sorento to promote the home media release of X-Men: Days of Future Past. The custom Sorento made its debut at the 2015 Australian Open, with a series of videos featuring Rafael Nadal teaming up with the X-Men to save the tennis event from the Sentinels.

In January 2015, Kia released their Sorento Super Bowl XLIX commercial featuring Pierce Brosnan.

== Fourth generation (MQ4; 2020) ==
Fourth generation
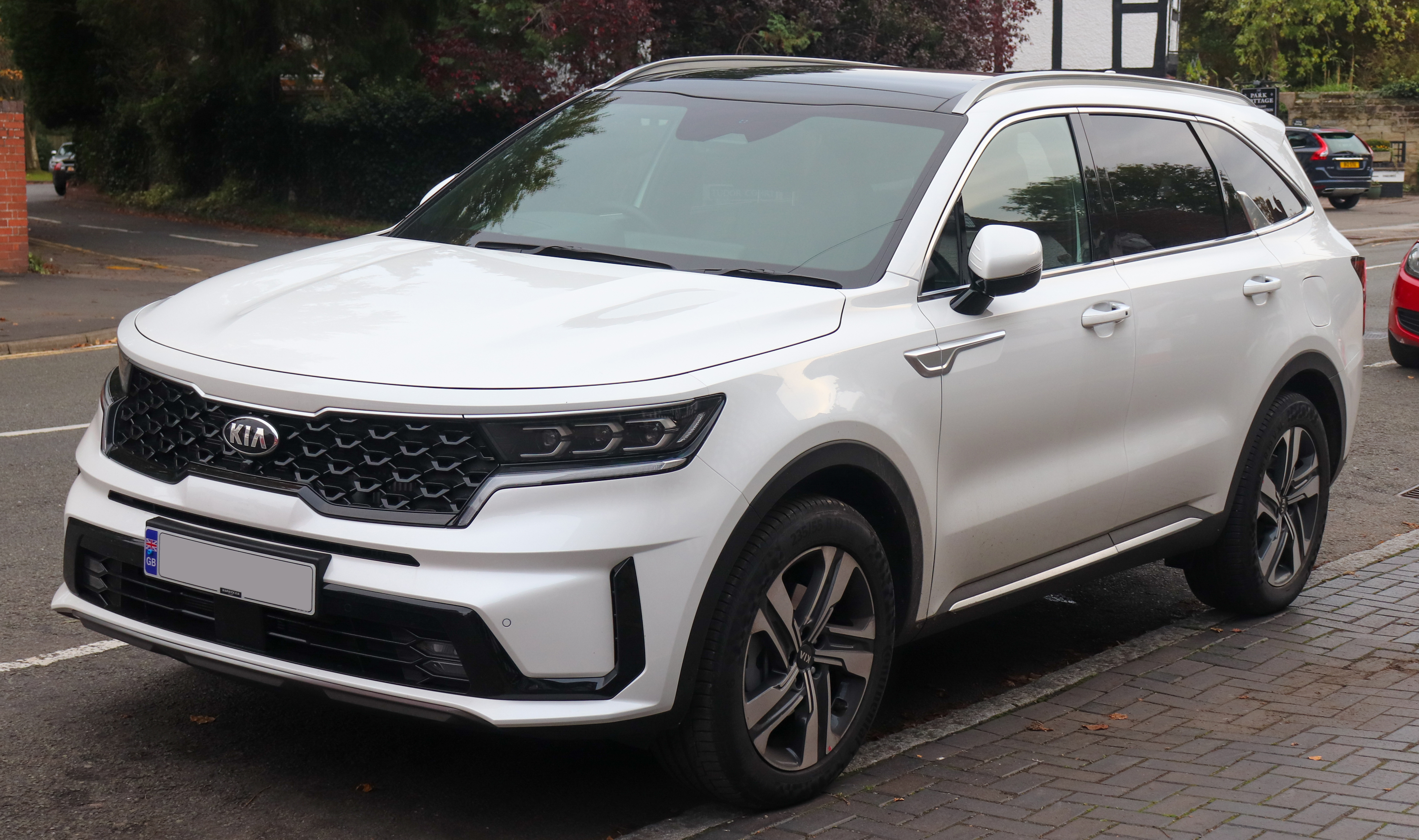
- Kia Sorento HEV (Pre-facelift)

Overview
- Model code: MQ4
- Production: July 2020–present
- Model years: 2021–present
- Assembly: South Korea: Hwaseong (Autoland Hwasung); United States: West Point, Georgia (KMMG); Vietnam: Chu Lai (THACO Kia); Malaysia: Kulim (Inokom); Pakistan: Karachi (Lucky Motor Corporation); India: Anantapur (Kia India)
- Designer: Karim Habib; Seo Je-Won

Body and chassis
- Layout: Front-engine, front-wheel-drive; Front-engine, all-wheel-drive
- Platform: Hyundai-Kia N3
- Chassis: Unibody
- Related: Hyundai Santa Fe (TM); Hyundai Santa Fe (MX5); Hyundai Santa Cruz; Hyundai Tucson (NX4); Kia Sportage (NQ5)

Powertrain
- Engine: Petrol: 2.5 L Smartstream G2.5 MPi I4; 2.5 L Smartstream G2.5 GDi I4; 2.5 L Smartstream G2.5 T-GDi I4; 3.5 L Smartstream G3.5 MPi V6; Petrol hybrid/plug-in hybrid: 1.6 L Smartstream G1.6 T-GDi I4; Diesel: 2.2 L Smartstream D2.2 CRDi I4
- Transmission: 6-speed automatic; 8-speed automatic; 8-speed Smartstream DCT
- Battery: 1.62 kWh lithium-ion (HEV); 13.68 kWh lithium-ion (PHEV)

Dimensions
- Wheelbase: 2,815 mm (110.8 in)
- Length: 4,810 mm (189.4 in)
- Width: 1,900 mm (74.8 in)
- Height: 1,695–1,700 mm (66.7–66.9 in)
- Curb weight: 1,685–2,099 kg (3,715–4,628 lb)

The fourth generation Sorento was officially unveiled through a series of images on 17 February 2020. The unveiling of the production version had originally been planned for the later-cancelled Geneva Motor Show.

The updated Sorento sports a larger design with an extended wheelbase (35 mm (1.4 in) longer) while the vehicle's overall length is extended by 10 mm (0.4 in). There are two engine options: a hybrid (a 1.6-litre turbocharged four-cylinder and single electric motor, amounting to 227 hp (230 PS; 169 kW) and 258 lb⋅ft (350 N⋅m; 35.7 kg⋅m) of torque) and a traditional petrol-only engine (a 2.5-litre turbocharged four-cylinder, matched with an 8-speed dual-clutch automatic transmission, output at 281 hp (285 PS; 210 kW) and 311 lb⋅ft (422 N⋅m; 43.0 kg⋅m). A plug-in hybrid variation and additional petrol engine options are also being planned, along with a multi-collision brake system and a remote smartphone surround view monitor.

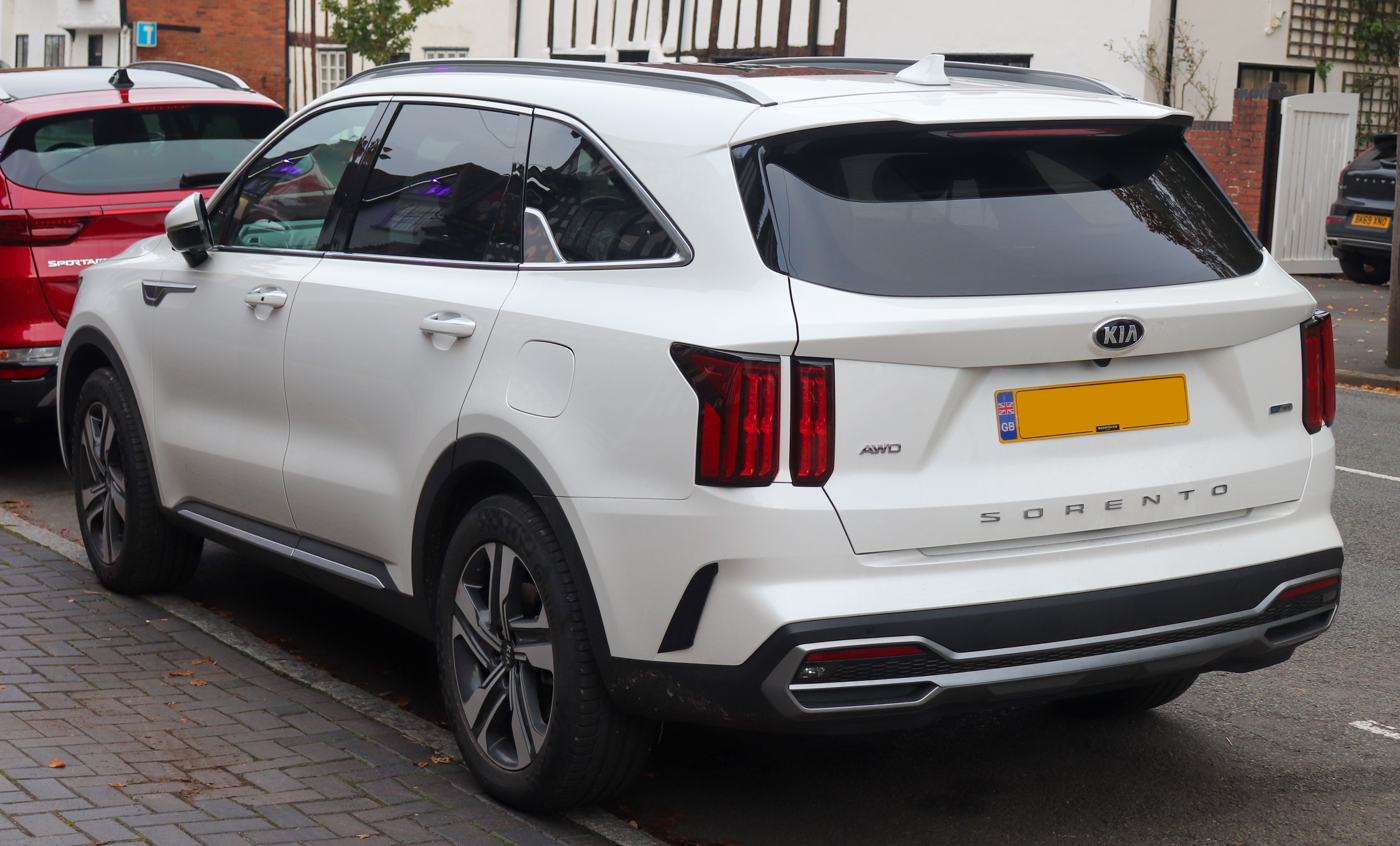
Kia Sorento HEV (Rear view; pre-facelift)

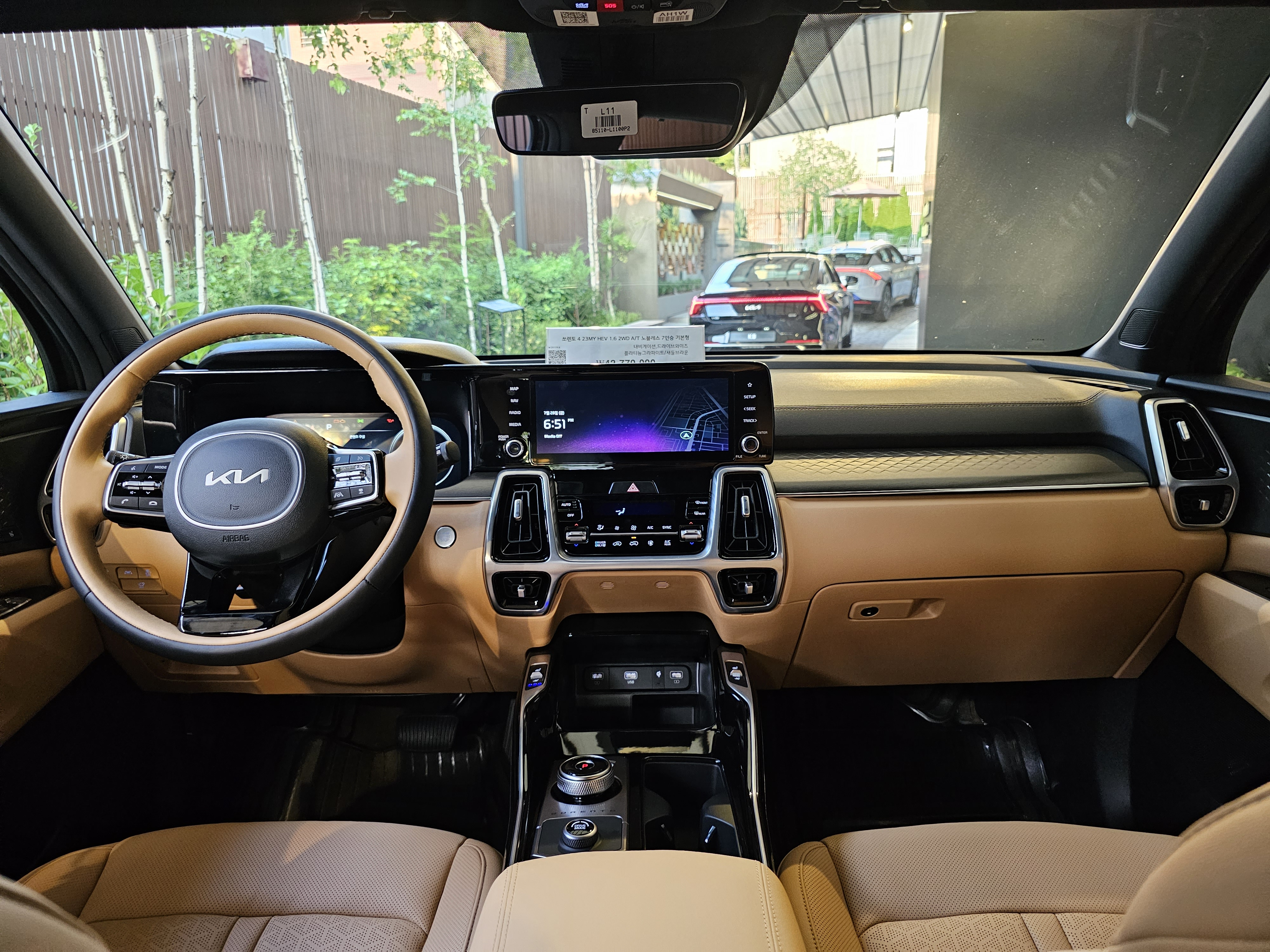
Interior (pre-facelift)

=== 2023 facelift ===
The facelifted model was unveiled on 25 July 2023. Made for the 2024 model year, the facelift adds vertically stacked LED headlamps which gain a slimmer design. The bumper is smoother, and is seamlessly aligned with the grille. The front lights are reminiscent of the EV9, the 2025 Carnival, and the 2024 Picanto, which foreshadows what Kia's design language is to become. Bodywork is primarily unchanged, if not for its slightly redone rear lights and rear bumper, new Kia emblem, and connected clusters. Additionally, the facelift adds new exterior colours and alloy wheels.

Inside, the interior designers have added a streamlined dashboard layout, as well as a new 12.3-inch curved display. Revised climate controls, a new ambient lighting stripe, and slimmer air vents have been added.

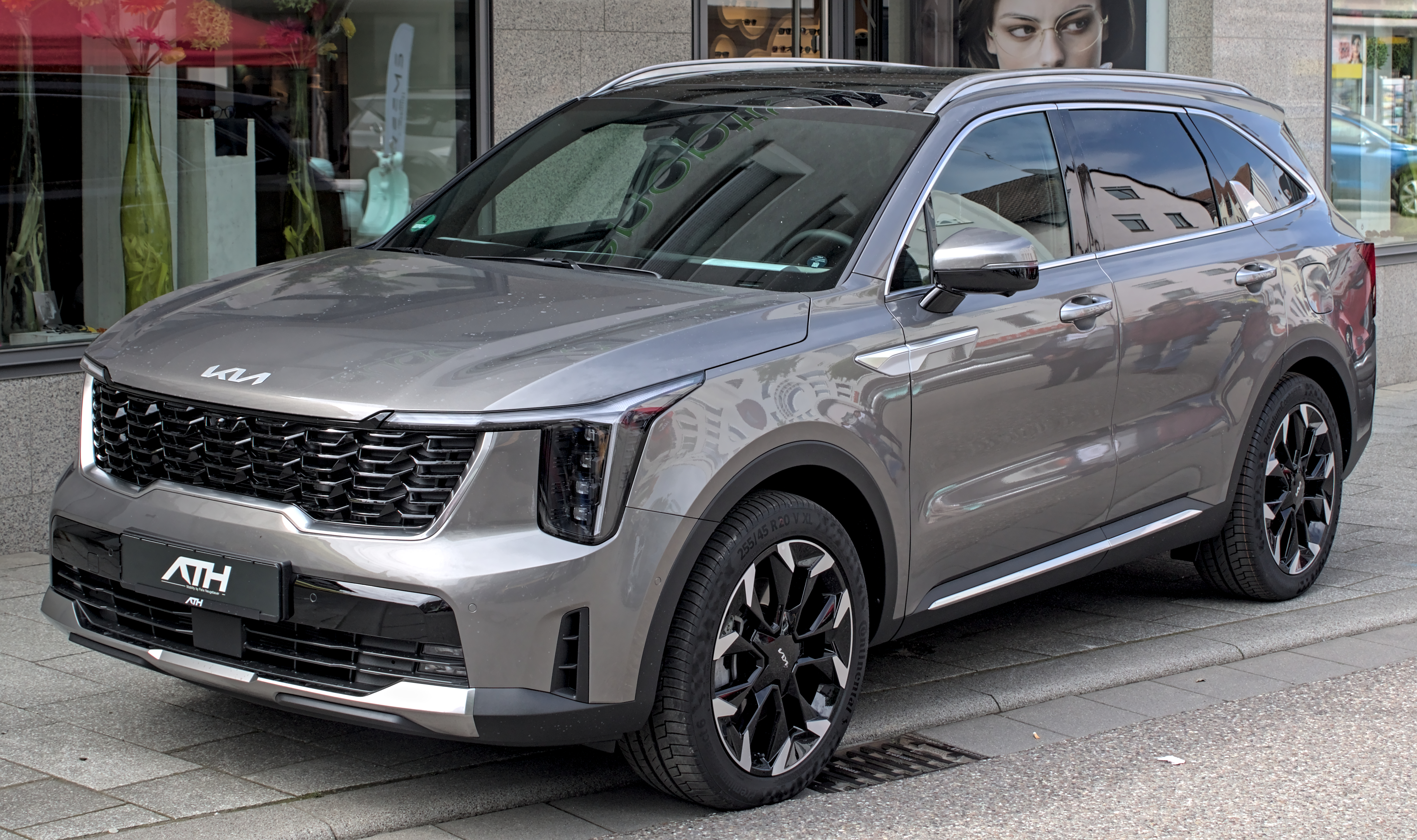
Kia Sorento (facelift; Europe)

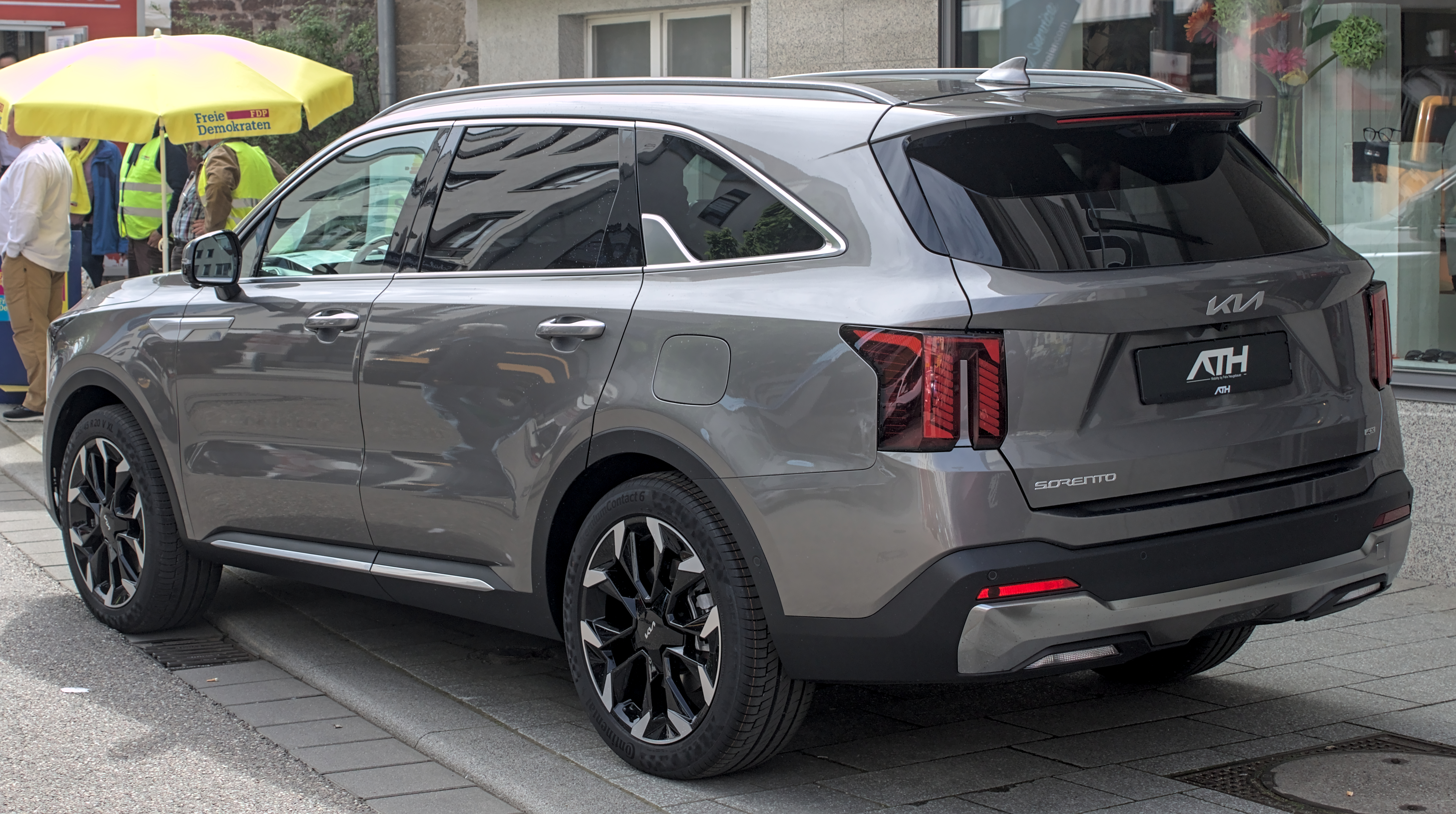
Kia Sorento (facelift; Europe)

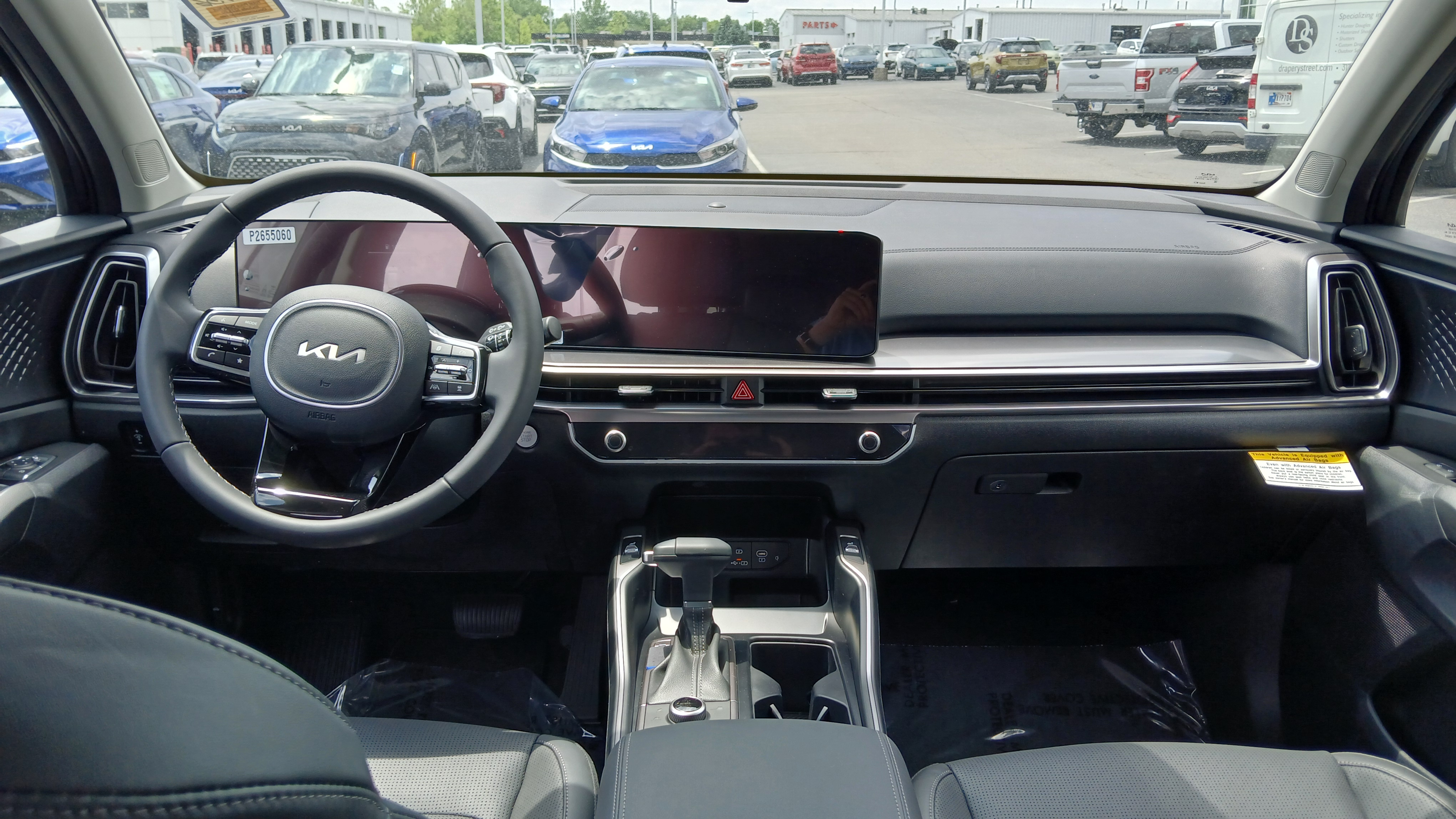
Interior

=== Markets ===
==== Asia ====
===== Cambodia =====
The fourth-generation Sorento was launched in Cambodia in March 2021 through local distributor Kia Cambodia. The Sorento is offered with a 2.2-litre CRDi turbocharged diesel engine and a 3.5 L Smartstream Naturally Aspirated V6 engine, both powertrains are equipped with all-wheel drive as standard. It is available in various trims, and all Cambodian‑market Sorento units are imported completely built‑up (CBU) from Kia's plant in South Korea.

The facelifted Sorento was launched in the Cambodia in August 2025. It is only available in the sole unnamed trim, powered by the 2.2L CRDi turbocharged diesel engine standard with all-wheel drive, and a 5-seater configuration.

===== India =====
In September 2026, Kia launched the facelifted fourth-generation (MQ4) Sorento in India. Locally manufactured at the company's Anantapur facility in Andhra Pradesh, the three-row SUV is offered in 6- and 7-seater configurations across six primary trims with options for a 1.6-litre turbo-petrol strong hybrid, a 2.2-litre diesel engine, and all-wheel drive (AWD) on higher variants.

===== Malaysia =====
The fourth-generation Sorento was launched in Malaysia on 3 March 2023, in three variants: 2.5 2WD (7-seater), 2.5 AWD (6-seater) and 2.2D AWD (6-seater). Two powertrain options are available: 2.5-litre GDi petrol and a 2.2-litre CRDi turbocharged diesel. It is locally assembled at the Kia Motor Manufacturing Malaysia (KMMM) assembly plant located in Kulim, Kedah.

===== Pakistan =====
The facelifted fourth-generation Sorento was launched in Pakistan on 10 May 2025, in three variants: 3.5L V6 FWD, 1.6L Turbo Hybrid FWD, and 1.6 Turbo Hybrid AWD. Just like its third-generation predecessor, the facelifted fourth-generation Sorento for the Pakistani market is locally assembled in Karachi, Pakistan, by Lucky Motor Corporation.

===== Philippines =====
The fourth-generation Sorento was launched in the Philippines on 8 November 2021, in two trim levels: EX and SX. It is powered by a 2.2-litre CRDi turbocharged diesel engine.

The facelifted Sorento was launched in the Philippines on 6 February 2025, in three trim levels: EX, EX+ and SX. All variants are powered by the 1.6-litre T-GDi Hybrid, and all-wheel drive standard on the EX+ and SX trims.

===== Singapore =====
Cycle & Carriage Kia launched the fourth-generation Sorento in Singapore on 17 October 2020, in three trim levels: SX Line, SX Tech Pack and GT Line Tech Pack. All variants are powered by a 2.2-litre CRDi turbocharged diesel engine. The 1.6-litre Hybrid petrol powertrain was added to the lineup in February 2022, it comes solely in the SX Tech grade.

The facelifted Sorento was launched in Singapore on 5 September 2024, in two variants: SX and SX Tech Pack, both variants are powered by the 1.6-litre T-GDi Hybrid.

===== Taiwan =====
The fourth-generation Sorento was launched in Taiwan on 11 November 2020, with four trim levels: Classic, Luxury, Flagship and Flagship Evolution. The Classic, Luxury and Flagship trims comes standard with a 7-seater configuration, while the 6-seater configuration comes standard on the Flagship Evolution trim but optional on the Luxury and Flagship trims. At launch, all variants were powered by the 2.2-litre CRDi turbocharged diesel engine. The Hybrid version was introduced in Taiwan on 3 May 2023 and was available with two variants.

The facelifted Sorento was launched on 7 October 2024, with three trim levels: Trendy, Apex and Signature. All facelifted Sorento variants comes standard with the 7-seater configuration, while the 6-seater configuration is available as an option on the Hybrid variants. Powertrain options remain unchanged from the pre-facelift model.

===== Thailand =====
The fourth-generation Sorento was debuted at Thailand International Motor Expo 2023 in November 2023 and went on sale in Thailand on 11 February 2024, in two variants: Premium HEV (7-seater) and Premium Plus PHEV (6-seater). Two powertrain options are available: a 1.6-litre T-GDi hybrid and a 1.6-litre T-GDi plug-in hybrid. Both variants are imported from Malaysia.

===== Vietnam =====
The fourth-generation Sorento was launched in Vietnam on 14 September 2020, in four trim levels: Deluxe, Luxury, Premium and Signature. At launch, two powertrains are available: 2.5-litre MPi petrol and 2.2-litre CRDi turbocharged diesel. All Sorento variants are locally assembled at the Kia THACO plant located in Chu Lai, Quảng Nam. In December 2022, the HEV and PHEV powertrains were added to the lineup, both powertrains were available in Premium and Signature trims.

The facelifted Sorento was launched in Vietnam on 13 September 2025, in four variants: 2.5G Signature FWD, 2.5G Signature AWD, 2.2D Signature FWD and 2.2D Signature AWD, it is powered by either 2.5-litre GDi petrol and a 2.2-litre CRDi turbocharged diesel engines each available as either front- and all-wheel drive. In June 2026, the facelifted HEV hybrid model was introduced in the sole Signature trim and available as either front- and all-wheel drive.

==== Europe ====
The fourth-generation Sorento was released in the European market in August 2020. Three powertrain options are available: 2.2-litre CRDi turbocharged diesel, 1.6-litre T-GDi Hybrid turbocharged petrol and a 1.6-litre T-GDi Plug-in Hybrid turbocharged petrol; an all-wheel drive system is optional but standard on the latter powertrain. For the European market, the Sorento is sourced from Hwaseong Plant located in Gyeonggi, South Korea.

==== Latin America ====
===== Argentina =====
The facelifted fourth-generation Sorento was launched in Argentina on 21 September 2026, in the sole SX trim powered by a 2.2-litre CRDi turbocharged diesel engine.

===== Brazil =====
The facelifted fourth-generation Sorento was launched in Brazil on 27 January 2026, marking the return of the Sorento in the Brazilian market after a 6-year hiatus. It is available in the sole EX trim powered by a 2.2-litre CRDi turbocharged diesel engine.

===== Chile =====
The fourth-generation Sorento was launched in Chile on 22 April 2021, in two trim levels: Standard and Full. All variants are powered by a 2.5-litre GDi petrol engine, with option of all-wheel drive.

The facelifted Sorento was launched in Chile on 12 June 2024, with six variants: 2.5L AT6 2WD, 2.5L AT6 AWD, V6 3.5L AT8 AWD Full, 2.2L diesel 8DCT 2WD, 2.2L diesel 8DCT AWD and 2.2L diesel 8DCT AWD Full. For powertrains, it is available with a 2.5-litre MPi petrol, a 3.5-litre MPi V6 petrol and a 2.2-litre CRDi turbocharged diesel.

===== Colombia =====
The fourth-generation Sorento was launched in Colombia on 18 October 2023, as a sole variant, powered by a 3.5-litre MPi V6 petrol engine and all-wheel drive is standard.

The facelifted Sorento was launched in Colombia on 16 August 2024, in the sole Zenith grade, powered by either a 3.5-litre V6 MPi petrol or a 2.2-litre CRDi turbocharged diesel.

===== Mexico =====
The fourth-generation Sorento was launched in Mexico on 14 January 2021, in four trim levels: LX, EX, EX Pack and SX. All trim levels comes as a 7-seater, except for the SX that comes as a 6-seater. All variants were powered by a 2.5-litre GDi petrol engine. In November 2021, the 2.5-litre T-GDi turbocharged petrol engine was added for the SX-L trim (replacing the former SX trim) and the LX trim was discontinued.

The facelifted Sorento was launched in Mexico on 12 March 2024, with trim levels and powertrain options remain unchanged from the pre-facelift model.

==== North America ====
In September 2020, the fourth-generation Sorento made its debut in North America. It is offered in several different trim levels: LX, S, EX, SX, SX Prestige, and SX Prestige X-Line. LX and S models is powered by a naturally-aspirated 2.5-litre 4-cylinder Smartstream petrol engine producing 191 hp (194 PS; 142 kW), while EX, SX, SX Prestige, and SX Prestige X-Line models uses a 2.5-litre turbocharged Smartstream 4-cylinder petrol engine producing 281 hp (285 PS; 210 kW). All North American Sorento uses an 8-speed automatic transmission, though models equipped with the 2.5-litre turbo engine uses an 8-speed dual-clutch transmission. The V6 engine is no longer offered. Sorento hybrid models will be available after the initial launch in late 2020.

In 2021, Kia announced the introduction of the Sorento PHEV which gets 261 hp from its 1.6-litre turbo four-cylinder mated to an electric motor. Claimed EV range is 51 km (32 miles) and has a combined range of 740 km (460 miles). The only available trim for the PHEV model is SX Prestige.

Kia continued to build the North American-market Sorento at its assembly plant in West Point, Georgia, United States. All models include front-wheel-drive, except for the SX Prestige X-Line model and the hybrid models, which include standard all-wheel-drive. All North American-market 2021 Sorento feature three rows of seating, with higher trim levels featuring second-row captain's chairs in place of the standard second-row rear split bench seat. In North America, the Sorento's standard third-row seating distinguishes it from the related Hyundai Santa Fe (TM) which was only offered in a two-row configuration.

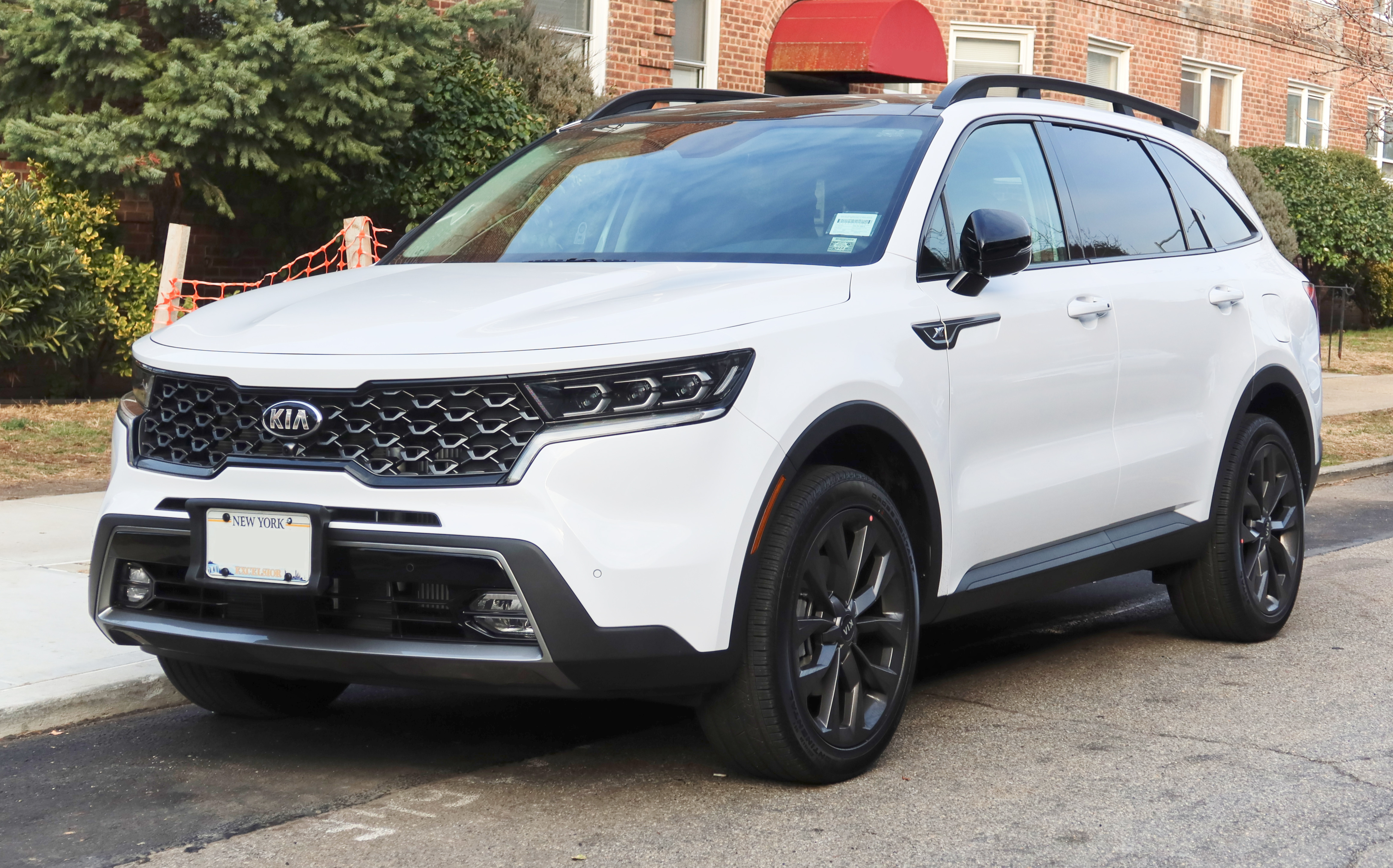
2021 Kia Sorento SX AWD (US)

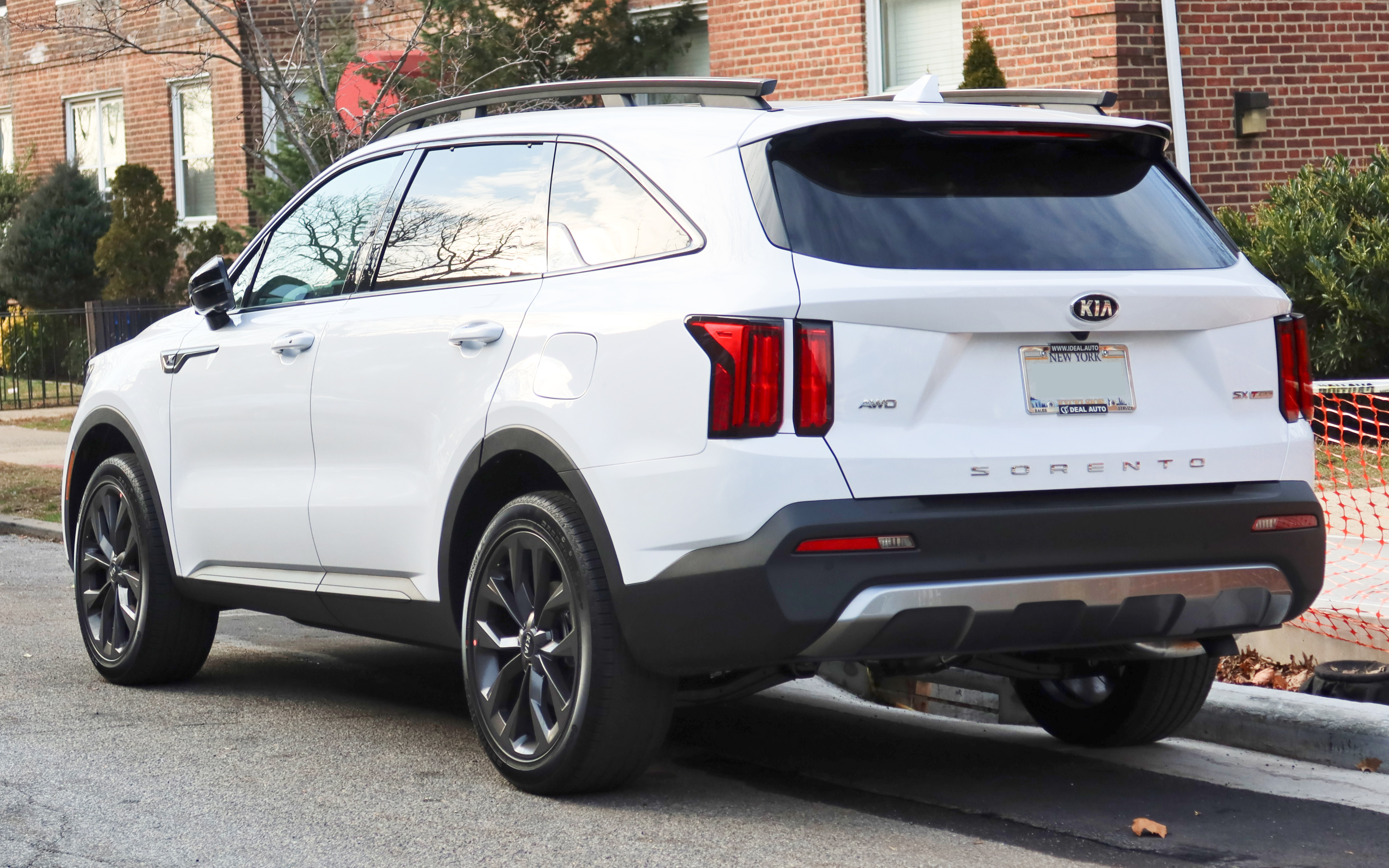
2021 Kia Sorento SX AWD (US)

==== Oceania ====
===== Australia =====
The fourth-generation Sorento went on sale in Australia in August 2020, in four trim levels available at launch: S, Sport, Sport+ and GT Line. Two powertrains were available at launch: a 3.5-litre MPi V6 petrol and a 2.2-litre CRDi turbocharged diesel; the latter options comes with all-wheel drive as standard. The 1.6-litre Plug-in Hybrid petrol was added to the lineup in October 2021, for the GT Line grade. The 1.6-litre Hybrid petrol was added for the GT Line grade in April 2022, it has the option of all-wheel drive.

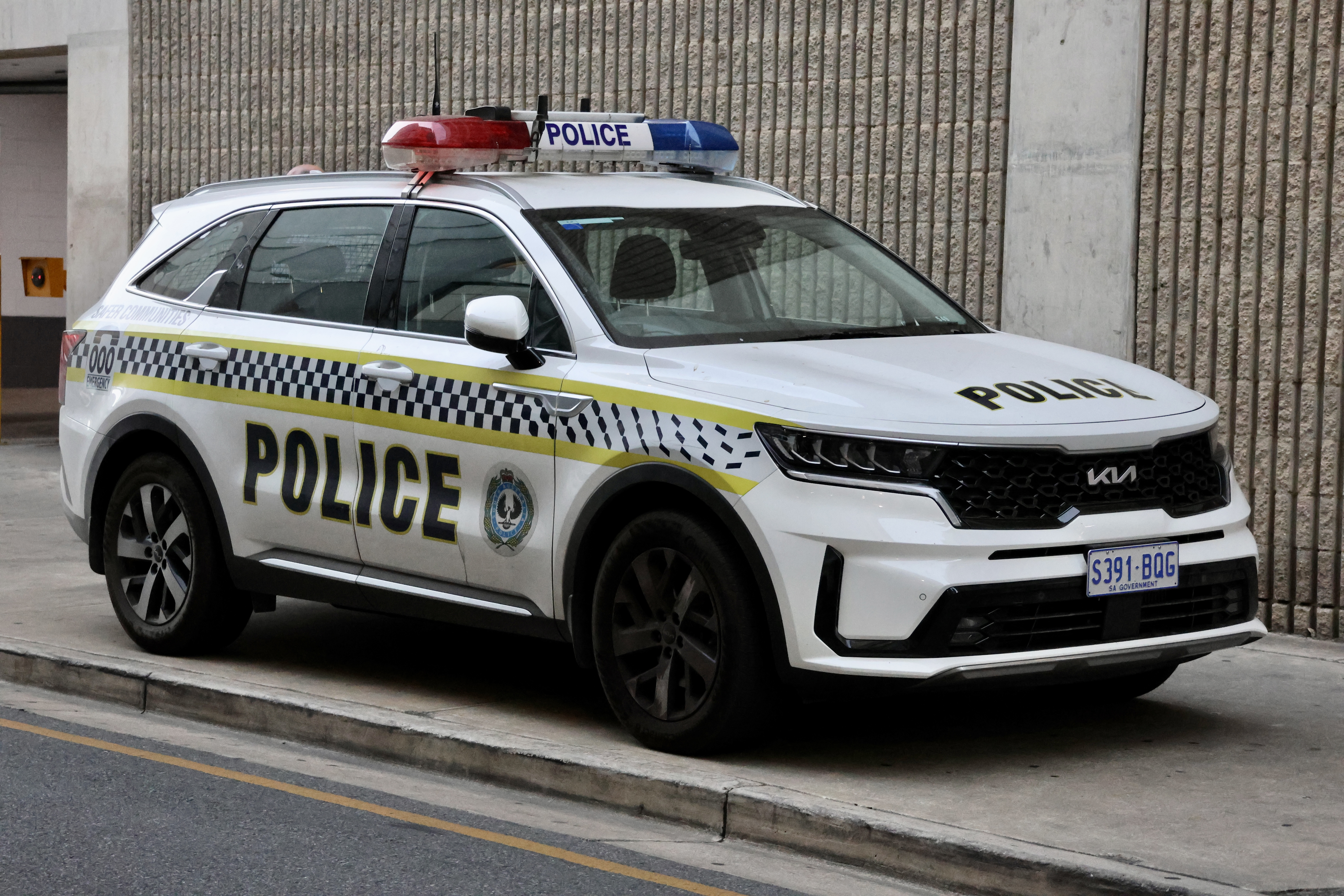
South Australia Police, 4th Gen. KIA Sorento

The facelifted Sorento debuted in Australia in January 2024, with variants and powertrain options remain unchanged from the pre-facelift model. In October 2025, the Hybrid and Plug-in Hybrid powertrains became available for the S, Sport and Sport trims.

The 3.5-litre V6 petrol was dropped from the range in 2026 to meet New Vehicle Efficiency Standard (NVES) emissions targets.

===== New Zealand =====
The fourth-generation Sorento was launched in New Zealand on 15 September 2020, in four trim levels: LX, EX, Deluxe and Premium. At launch, it is powered by a 2.2-litre CRDi turbocharged diesel. In March 2021, the Hybrid and Plug-in Hybrid powertrains were added to the lineup, both powertrains were available in EX and Premium trims.

==== Middle East ====
The fourth-generation Sorento was launched in the GCC markets in March 2021. There are two powertrains are available; 2.5-litre and 3.5-litre petrol engines. It is offered in three trim levels; LX, Mid and EX1.

The facelifted Sorento was launched in February 2024.

==== South Africa ====
The fourth-generation Sorento was launched in South Africa on 24 January 2022, in three trim levels: EX+, SX and SXL. It is powered by a 2.2-litre CRDi turbocharged diesel engine, with all-wheel drive standard it is optional on the EX+ grade.

The facelifted Sorento was launched in South Africa on 25 June 2025, with the same trim levels and engine option from the pre-facelift model and all-wheel drive became standard on the SX trim.

=== Awards ===
In January 2021, the Sorento 1.6 T-GDi Hybrid 2 was named Large SUV of the Year by What Car? magazine. What Car? awarded the Sorento four stars out of five in its review of the car.

In June 2022, the Sorento won Auto Trader UK's New Car Award for Best 7 Seater. Auto Trader awarded the Sorento four and a half stars out of five in its review of the car.

=== Safety ===
==== Euro NCAP ====
Euro NCAP test results Kia Sorento 1.6 T-GDi HEV GLS (LHD) (2020)
Test	Points	%
Overall:	5 /5 stars	
Adult occupant:	31.2	82%
Child occupant:	41.9	85%
Pedestrian:	34.1	63%
Safety assist:	14.0	87%

==== IIHS ====
===== 2021 =====
IIHS scores
Small overlap front (Driver)	Good		
Small overlap front (Passenger)	Good		
Moderate overlap front	Good		
Side (original test)	Good		
Roof strength	Good		
Head restraints and seats	Good		
Headlights	Good	Poor	varies by trim/option
Front crash prevention (Vehicle-to-Vehicle)	Superior		optional
Front crash prevention (Vehicle-to-Vehicle)	Superior		standard
Front crash prevention (Vehicle-to-Pedestrian, day)	Superior		optional
Front crash prevention (Vehicle-to-Pedestrian, day)	Advanced		standard
Child seat anchors (LATCH) ease of use	Acceptable		

===== 2024 =====
IIHS scores
Small overlap front	Good
Moderate overlap front (original test)	Good
Side (original test)	Good
Side (updated test)	Good
Roof strength	Good
Head restraints and seats	Good
Headlights	Acceptable
Front crash prevention (Vehicle-to-Pedestrian)	Good
Seatbelt reminders	Good
Child seat anchors (LATCH) ease of use	Acceptable

==== ANCAP ====
ANCAP test results Kia Sorento all variants (2020, aligned with Euro NCAP)
Test	Points	%
Overall:	5 /5 stars	
Adult occupant:	31.23	82%
Child occupant:	42.09	85%
Pedestrian:	34.13	63%
Safety assist:	14.25	89%

=== Powertrain ===
Specs
Model	Year	Transmission	Power	Torque	0–100 km/h (official)	Top speed
Petrol
Smartstream G2.5 MPi	2020–present	6-speed automatic	180 PS (132 kW; 178 hp) @ 6,000 rpm	23.7 kg⋅m (232 N⋅m; 171 lbf⋅ft) @ 4,000 rpm	10.1s (FWD); 10.3s (AWD)	195 km/h (121 mph)
Smartstream G2.5 GDi	2020–present	8-speed automatic	194 PS (143 kW; 191 hp) @ 6,100 rpm	25 kg⋅m (245 N⋅m; 181 lbf⋅ft) @ 4,000 rpm	9.5s (FWD); 10.0s (AWD)	200 km/h (124 mph)
Smartstream G2.5 T-GDi	2020–present	8-speed dual clutch	285 PS (210 kW; 281 hp) @ 5,800 rpm	43 kg⋅m (422 N⋅m; 311 lbf⋅ft) @ 1,700–4,000 rpm	7.4s (FWD); 7.6s (AWD)	211 km/h (131 mph)
Smartstream G3.5 MPI	2020–present	8-speed automatic	272 PS (200 kW; 268 hp) @ 6,400 rpm	33.8 kg⋅m (331 N⋅m; 244 lbf⋅ft) @ 5,000 rpm	8.0s	210 km/h (130 mph)
Hybrid
Smartstream G1.6 T-GDi Hybrid	2020–present	6-speed automatic	230 PS (169 kW; 227 hp) @ 5,500 rpm	35.7 kg⋅m (350 N⋅m; 258 lbf⋅ft) @ 1,500–4,400 rpm	8.6s (FWD); 9.0s (AWD)	193 km/h (120 mph)
Smartstream G1.6 T-GDi Plug-in Hybrid	2021–present	6-speed automatic	265 PS (195 kW; 261 hp) @ 5,500 rpm	35.7 kg⋅m (350 N⋅m; 258 lbf⋅ft) @ 1,500–4,400 rpm	8.7s	193 km/h (120 mph)
Diesel
Smartstream D2.2 CRDi	2020–present	8-speed DCT	202 PS (149 kW; 199 hp) @ 3,800 rpm	45.0 kg⋅m (441 N⋅m; 325 lbf⋅ft) @ 1,750–2,750 rpm	9.2s	205 km/h (127 mph)

== Sales ==
Calendar year	U.S	Canada	Mexico	South Korea	Europe	Australia	Global
2002	8,451			52,963	7,212		
2003	40,787			68,051	22,499		
2004	52,878			48,082	34,789		
2005	47,610			29,521	44,980		
2006	50,672			21,589	36,520		
2007	36,300			11,963	25,205		
2008	29,699			6,137	14,212		
2009	24,460			1,039	13,746		
2010	108,984			42,480	14,304		
2011	130,235			40,602	13,592		
2012	119,597	14,031		35,002	10,741	3,276	219,154
2013	105,649	14,542		29,168	7,610		
2014	102,520	13,982		38,126	9,390		
2015	116,249	14,372	2,769	77,767	16,539		
2016	114,733	15,466	7,240	80,715	15,344		
2017	99,684	14,181	7,923	78,458	12,570		
2018	107,846	15,579	9,557	67,200	10,017		
2019	95,951	16,054	7,074	52,325	9,703	3,777	
2020	74,677	11,821	2,473	82,275	6,885	4,547	
2021	81,785	10,275	2,071	69,934	16,436	5,126	
2022	86,406	6,935	2,115	68,902	11,471	7,889	222,570
2023	88,625	6,172	2,308	85,811	18,384	8,366	242,892
2024	95,154	10,741	2,150	94,538	14,660	9,791	280,705
2025	94,772						
