= Hawtai B11 =

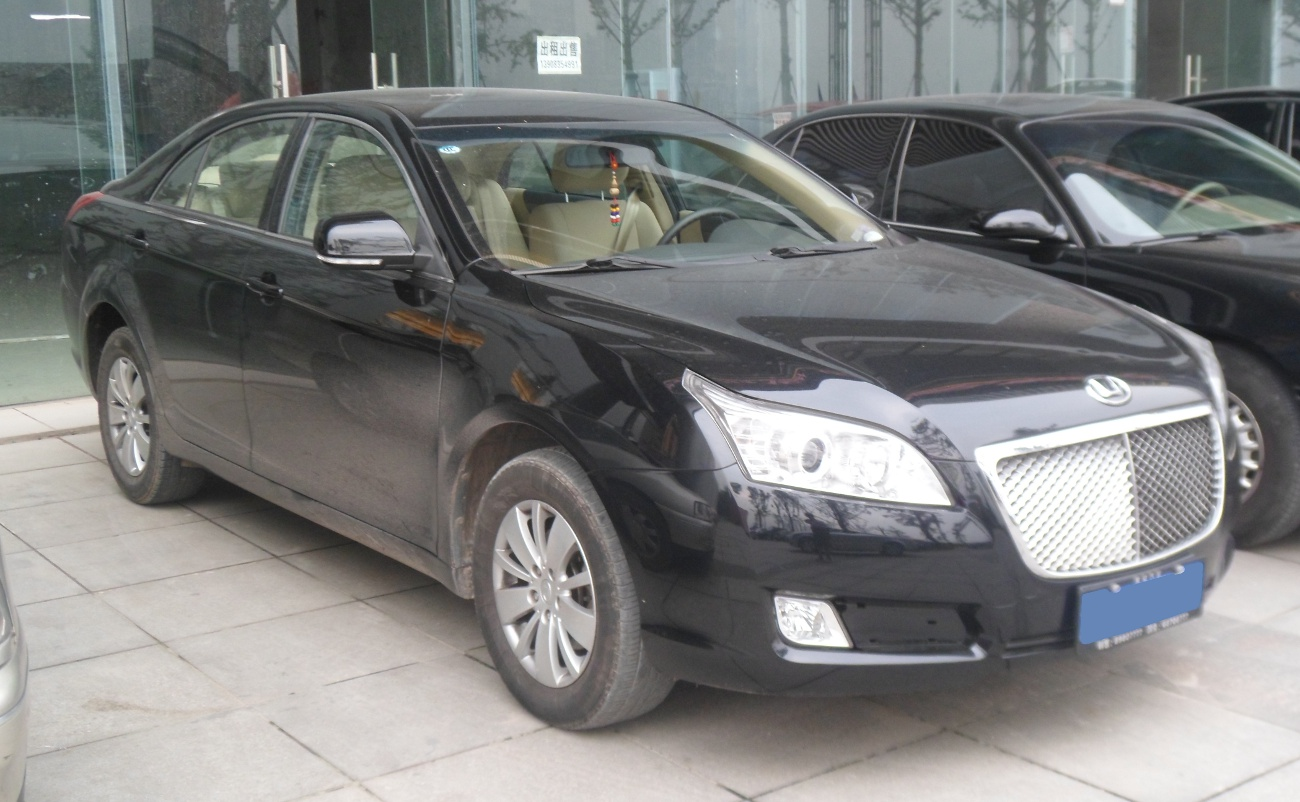
- Hawtai B11

Overview
- Manufacturer: Hawtai
- Production: 2010–2018
- Assembly: Rongcheng, Shandong, China

Body and chassis
- Body style: 4-door sedan
- Layout: Front-engine, front-wheel-drive

Powertrain
- Engine: 1.8 L I4; 2.0 L diesel DOHC I4
- Transmission: 4-speed automatic 5-speed manual

Dimensions
- Wheelbase: 2,764 mm (108.8 in)
- Length: 4,943 mm (194.6 in)
- Width: 1,852 mm (72.9 in)
- Height: 1,511 mm (59.5 in)
- Curb weight: 1625kg

The Hawtai B11 (华泰 B11) is a full-size sedan produced by Shandong Province-based Chinese auto maker Hawtai.

== Overview ==
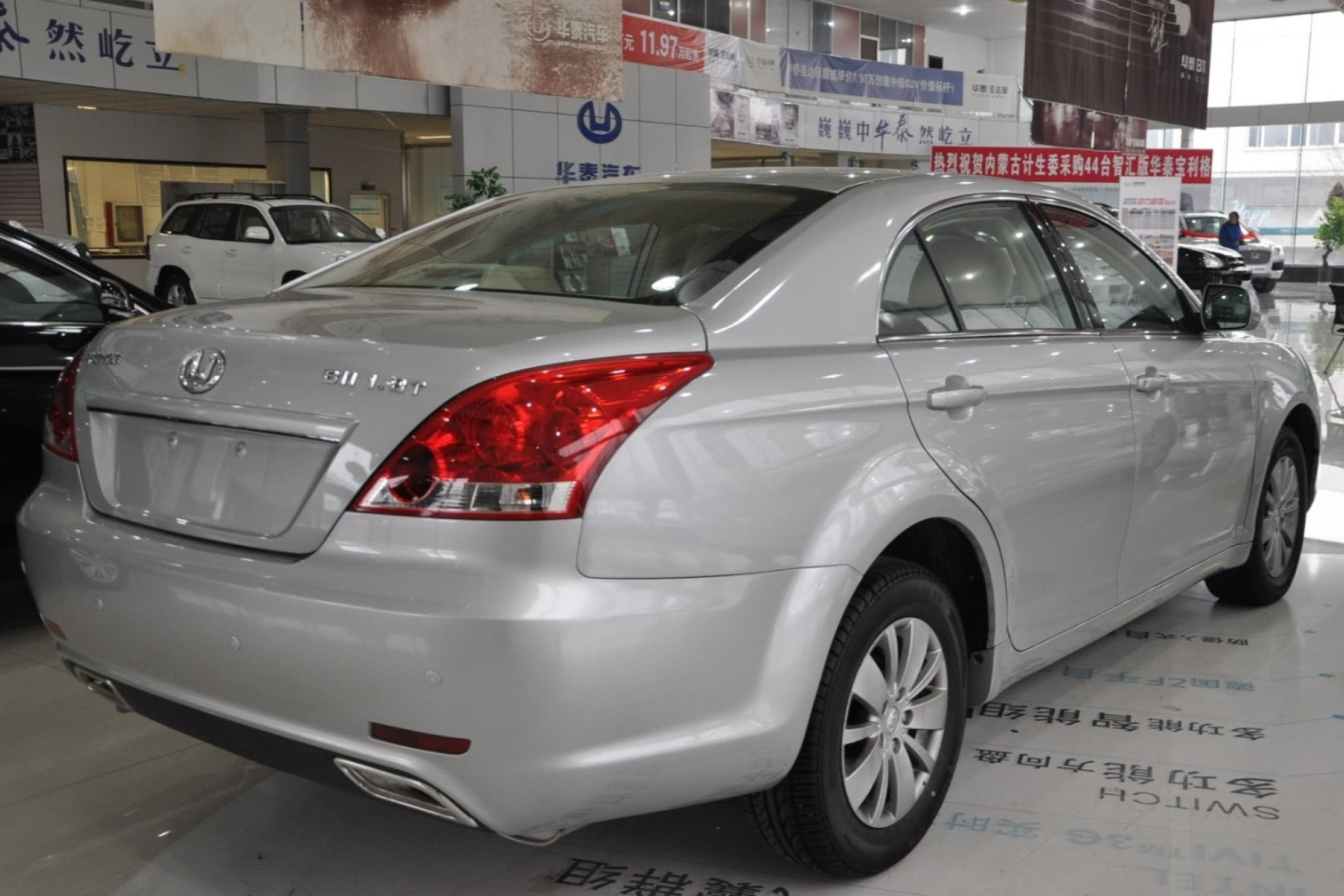
Hawtai B11 rear quarter

The Hawtai B11 was originally previewed as a preproduction concept on the 2010 Beijing Auto Show. Production started in August 2010, and was listed and priced by December 2010 with prices ranging between 119,700 yuan and 143,700 yuan.

At the 2012 Beijing Auto Show Hawtai presented a more upmarket "Luxury Series" variant, essentially luxurious versions of the existing B11 sedan alongside the luxurious version of the Baolige.

=== Powertrain ===
Power of the B11 comes from a 1.8 liter turbo engine and 2.0 liter turbodiesel engine. The 1.8 liter turbo engine is supplied by SAIC and delivers 160 hp and 215 nm, while the Huatai 2.0 liter turbo diesel engine version is designated for export with 150 hp and 310 nm. Gearbox options include a 4-speed automatic transmission or 5-speed manual transmission.

=== Interior technology ===
For the interior infotainment system, the B11 is equipped with an Intel TIVI infotainment system that features a permanent 3G connection. In addition, the B11 also comes with a Linux-powered media center for phone, GPS, DVD and digital tv.
