= E70 =

E70 may refer to:

- European route E70
- International Waterway E70
- BMW X5 (E70)
- Toyota Corolla (E70)
- E70, one of the Common ethanol fuel mixtures
- Nokia E70 mobile phone
- King's Indian Defense, Encyclopaedia of Chess Openings code
- Izu-Jūkan Expressway, route E70 in Japan
- Hawtai Lusheng E70, a Chinese saloon
