= Hyundai Terracan =

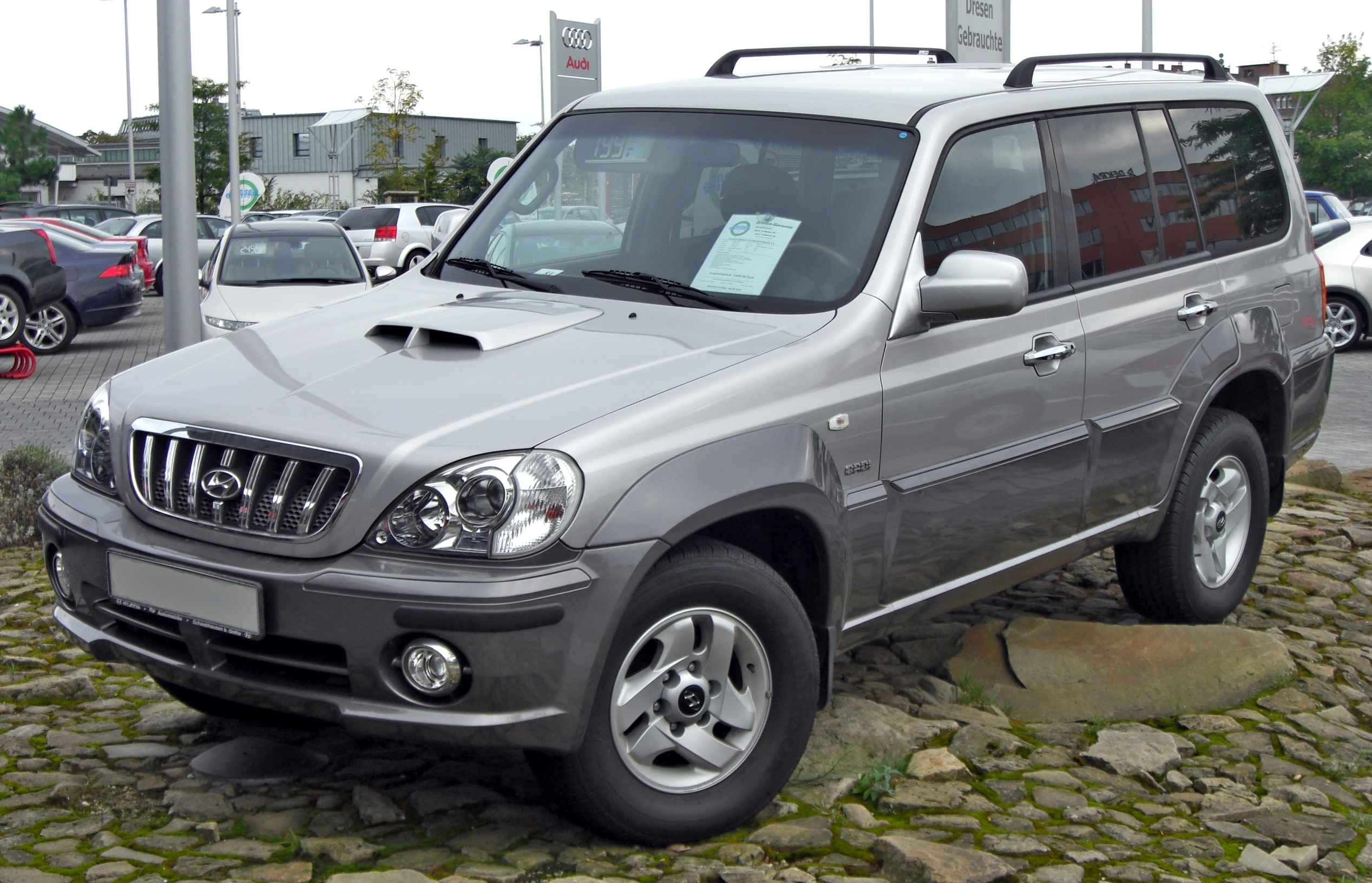

Overview
- Manufacturer: Hyundai
- Also called: Hawtai Terracan (China)
- Production: 2001–2007 (South Korea); 2003–2011 (China); 2003–2007 (India)
- Assembly: South Korea: Ulsan; China: Rongcheng, Shandong (Hawtai); India: Chennai (Hyundai India)

Body and chassis
- Class: Mid-size SUV
- Body style: 5-door SUV
- Layout: Front-engine, four-wheel-drive
- Related: Mitsubishi Pajero; Kia Sorento; Hyundai Galloper

Powertrain
- Engine: gasoline: 2.4 L 4G64 I4 (China); 3.5 L Sigma V6; diesel: 2.5 L D4BF turbo I4; 2.9 L J-Series turbo I4
- Transmission: 5-speed manual 4-speed automatic

Dimensions
- Wheelbase: 2,750 mm (108.3 in)
- Length: 4,700 mm (185.0 in)
- Width: 1,860 mm (73.2 in)
- Height: 1,840 mm (72.4 in)

Chronology
- Predecessor: Hyundai Galloper
- Successor: Hyundai Veracruz

The Hyundai Terracan is a mid-size SUV produced by the South Korean manufacturer Hyundai Motor Company from 2001 to 2007. It was kept in production in China, by Hawtai Motor Group, until 2011.

== Overview ==
The design of the Hyundai Terracan was originally previewed by the Hyundai Highland concept and featured a chassis derived from the second generation Mitsubishi Pajero. It was powered by one of three engines: a 2.9 liter diesel inline-four Hyundai J engine, a 2.5 liter diesel inline-four licensed from Mitsubishi (4D56), and a 3.5 liter petrol V6 Hyundai Sigma engine. The car's name derives from Tarascan, a Mesoamerican empire state located in west central Mexico. The Terracan was replaced by the Hyundai Veracruz.

== Markets ==
=== Australia ===
Australian specification Terracans were available in three trim levels - base and Highlander. Highlander models came standard with leather seats, climate control air conditioning and an automatic 4WD differential that engaged 4WD on the fly. All models came with low range gearing and a separate ladder frame chassis.

=== China ===
The Terracan has also been built and sold in China from 2003 to 2011 under the Hawtai brand in a joint venture with Hyundai that lasted up to 2010. Only the facelifted version was available there, and came with the 2.4 liter 4G64, a 2.5 liter diesel, 2.9 liter J-Series diesel, or the 3.5 liter Sigma V6 engine. Transmission choices were a 5-speed manual or 4 speed automatic.

== 2001 ==
The Terracan was offered with three engines: a 3.5 litre V6 gasoline, a 2.5 litre diesel licensed from Mitsubishi, and a more fuel-efficient 2.9 litre diesel offered in Europe, Australia and New Zealand.

== 2002 ==
When the Terracan entered its second year the only changes were some additional colors.

== 2005 ==
2005 brought a light facelift.

== Gallery ==
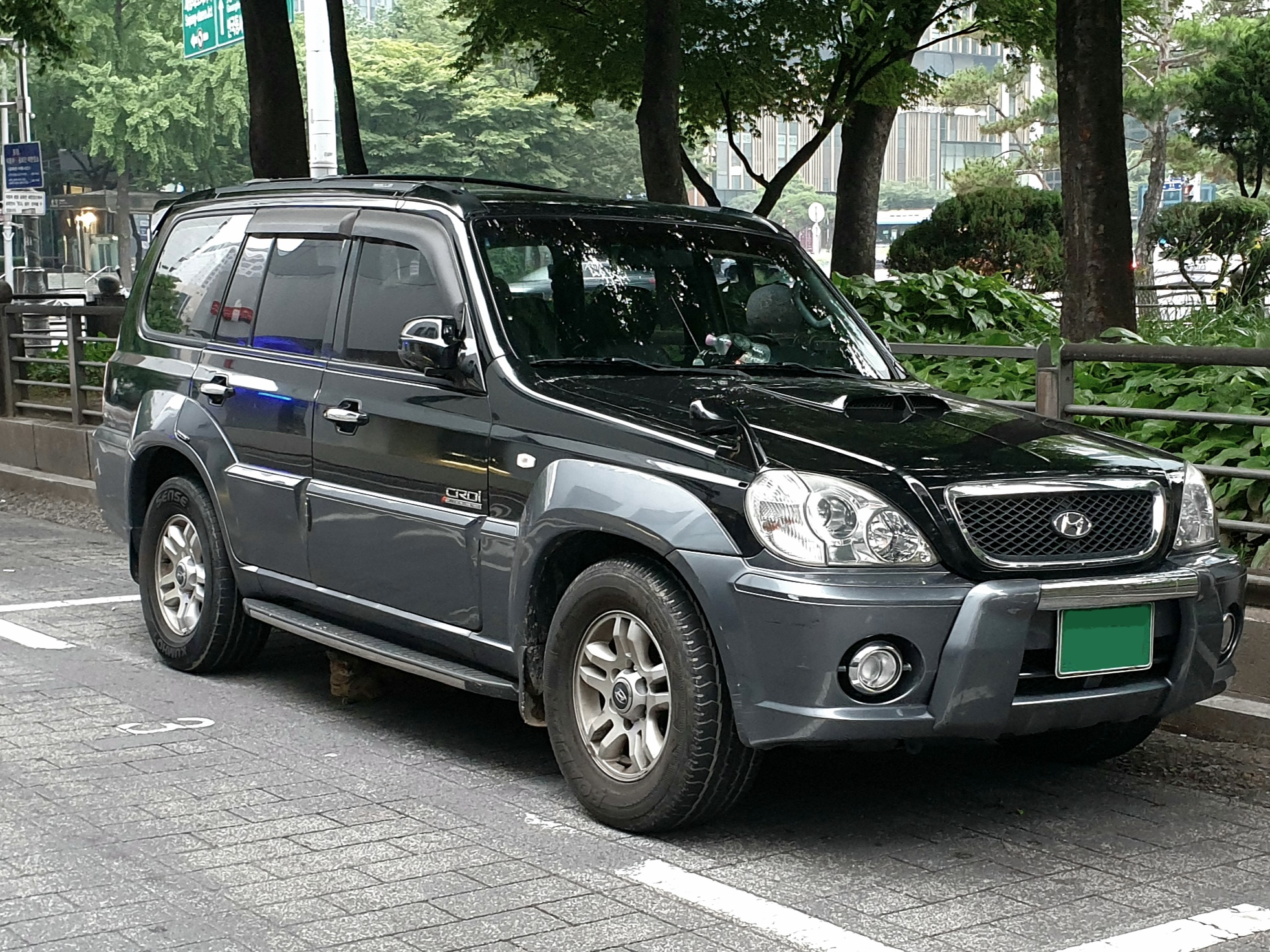
2004 Hyundai Terracan (pre-facelift; front)

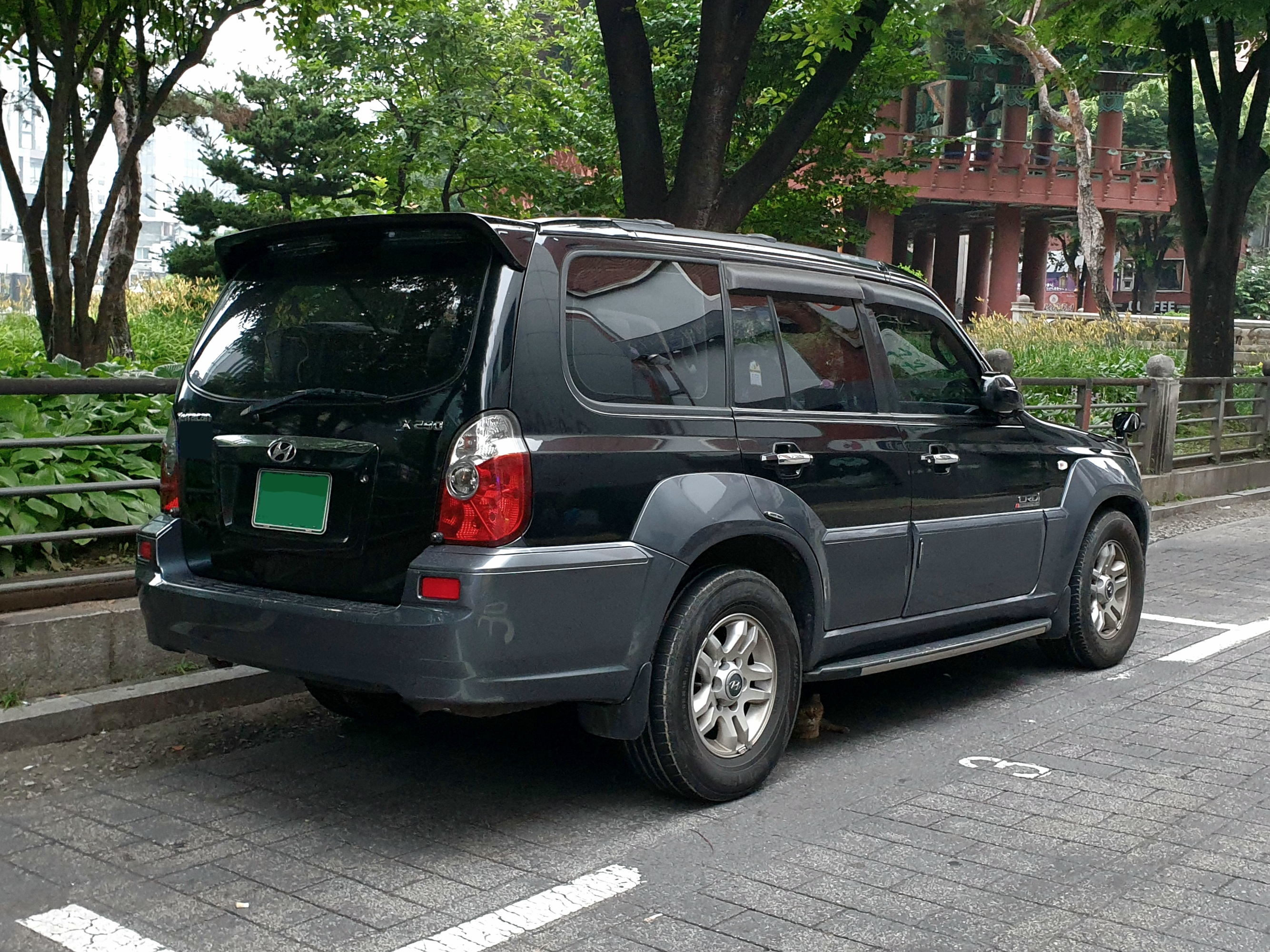
2004 Hyundai Terracan (pre-facelift; rear)

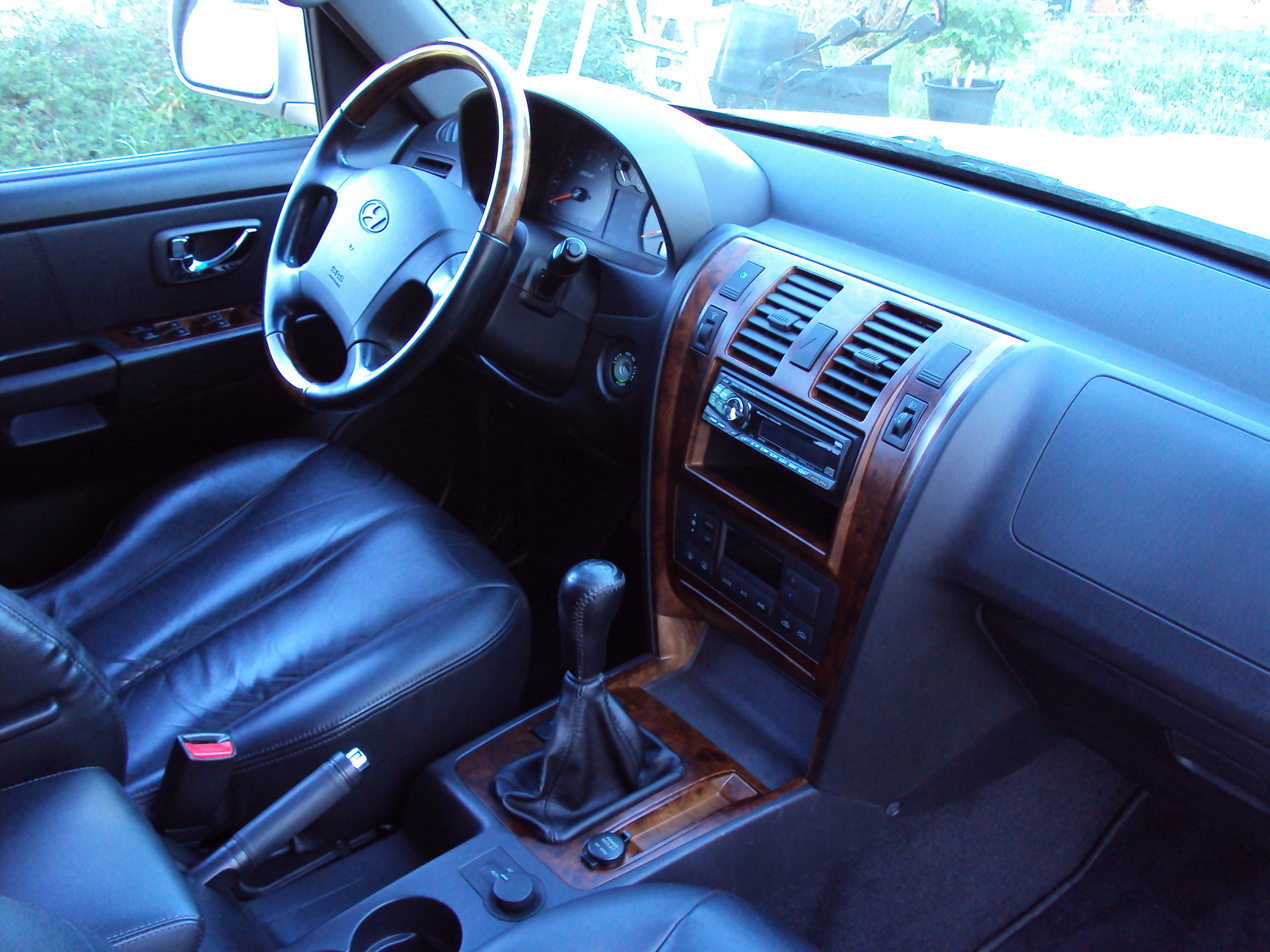
2003 Hyundai Terracan interior

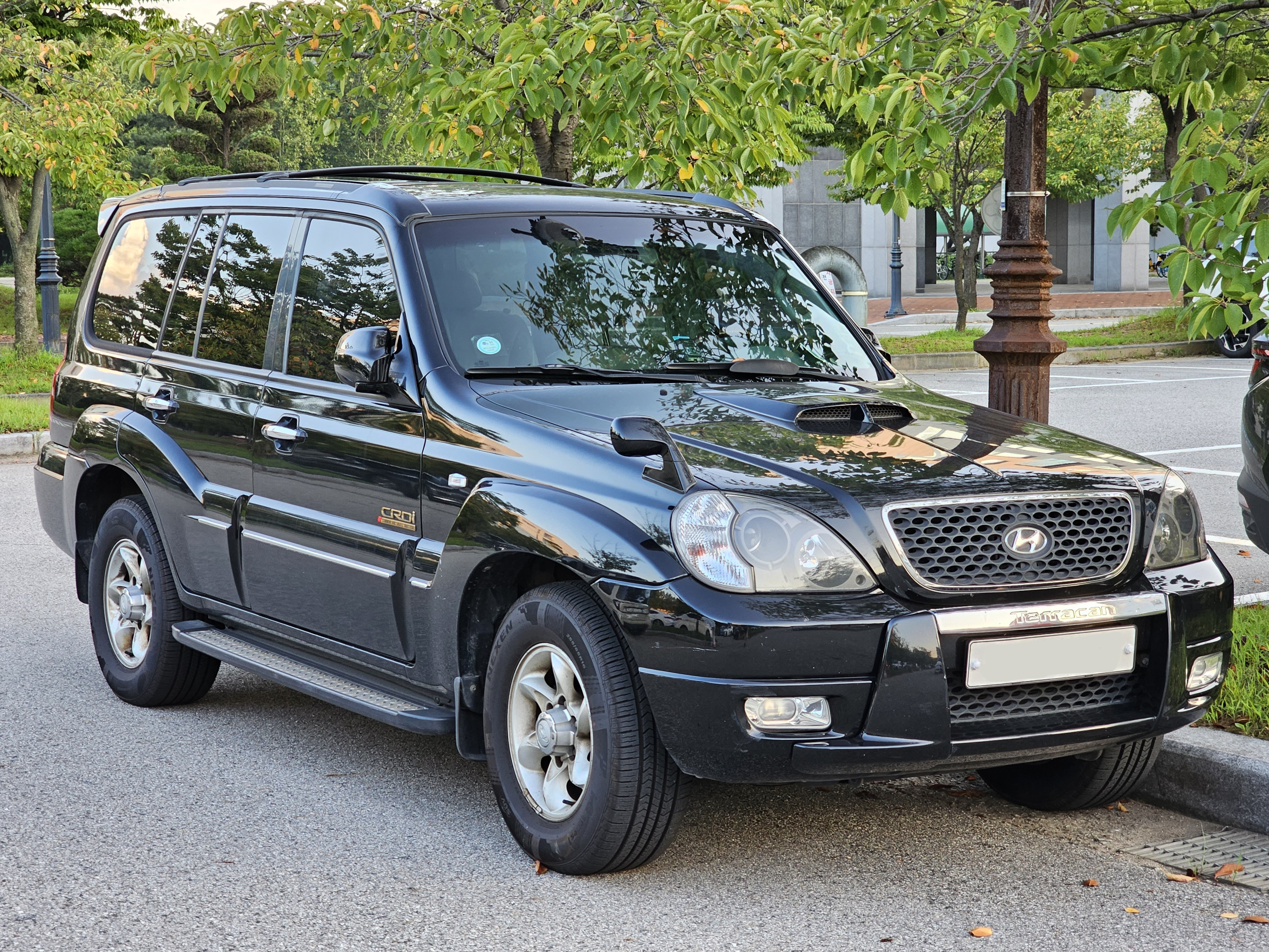
2007 Hyundai Terracan (facelift; front)

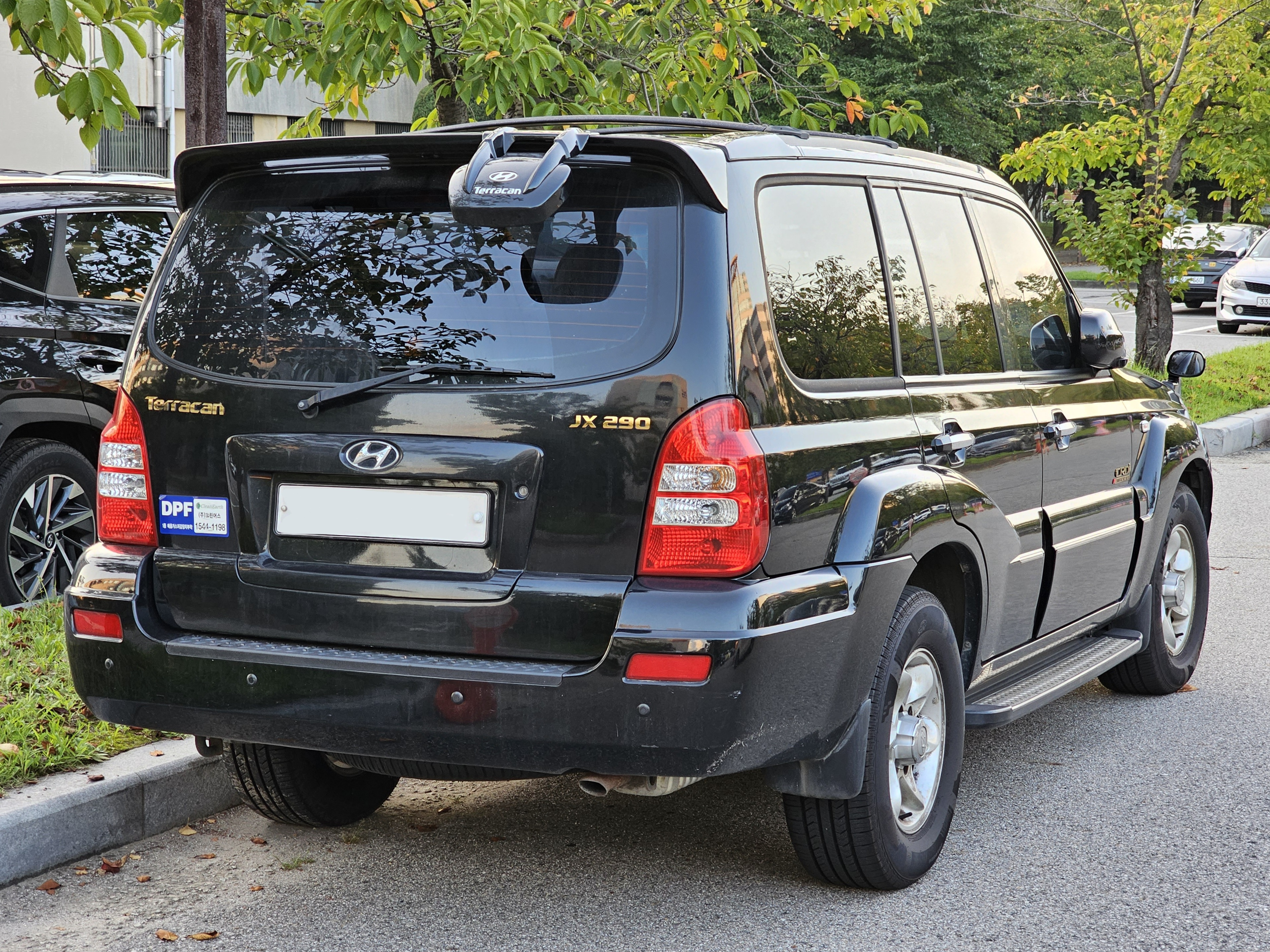
2007 Hyundai Terracan (facelift; rear)

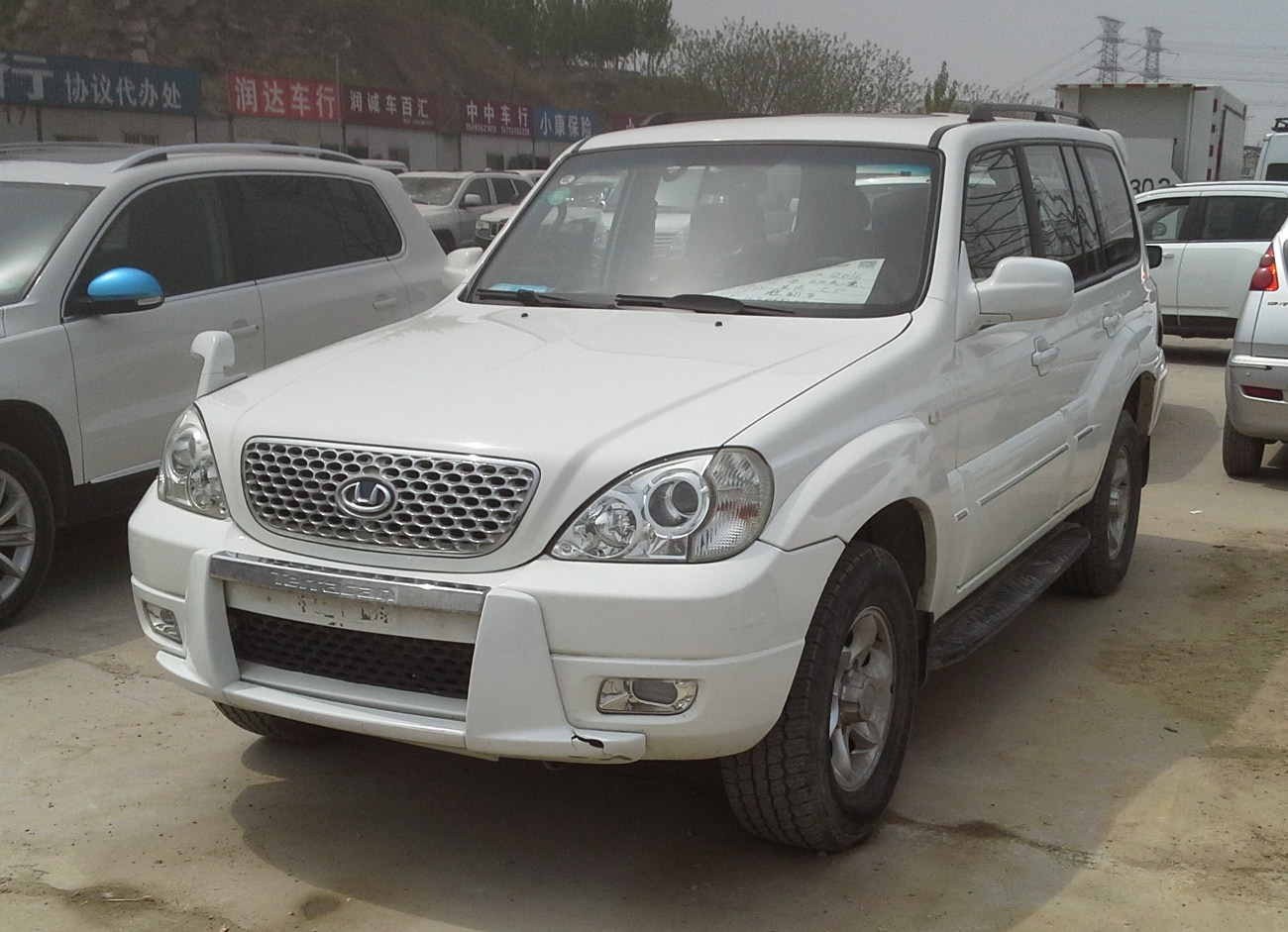
Hawtai Terracan front (China)

== See also ==
- Mitsubishi Pajero
