= Hawtai Bolgheri =

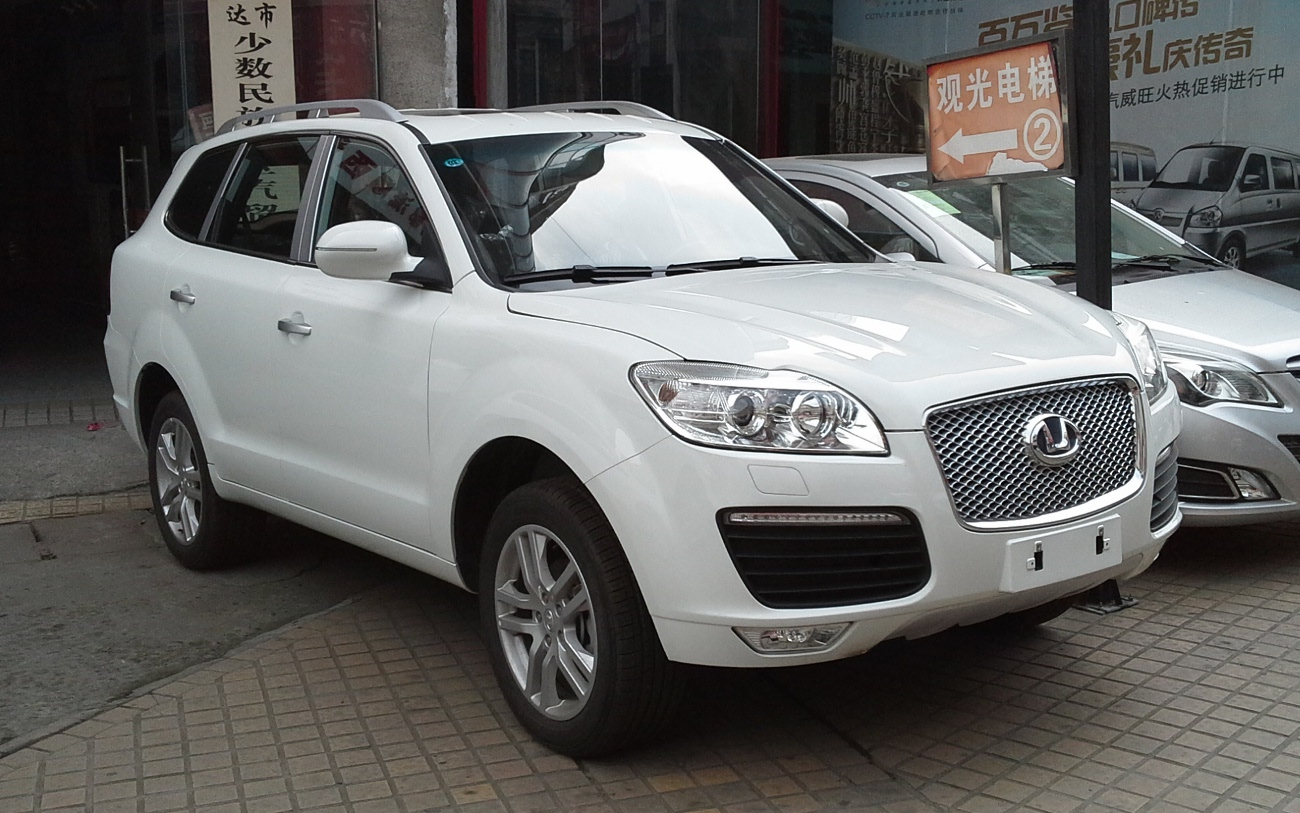

Overview
- Also called: Hawtai B35; Hawtai Baolige; Hawtai Bolgheri Plus; Hawtai Shengdafei 7 Hawtai Boliger S
- Production: 2011–2018
- Model years: 2011–2018

Body and chassis
- Class: Compact crossover SUV
- Body style: 5-door SUV
- Related: Hawtai Shengdafei 5

Powertrain
- Engine: 2.0 L Turbo Diesel engine; 1.8 L Turbo petrol engine
- Transmission: 4-speed ZF automatic 5-speed manual

Dimensions
- Wheelbase: 2,620 mm (103.1 in)
- Length: 4,618 mm (181.8 in); Turbo: 4,783 mm (188.3 in)
- Width: 1,858 mm (73.1 in)
- Height: 1,753 mm (69.0 in)

The Hawtai Bolgheri and the later Hawtai Shengdafei 7 is a compact crossover SUV produced by the Chinese manufacturer Hawtai from 2011 to 2018. The original Bolgheri was criticized for resembling the first generation Porsche Cayenne while it is in fact built on the same platform as the Hawtai Shengdafei 5.

== Overview ==
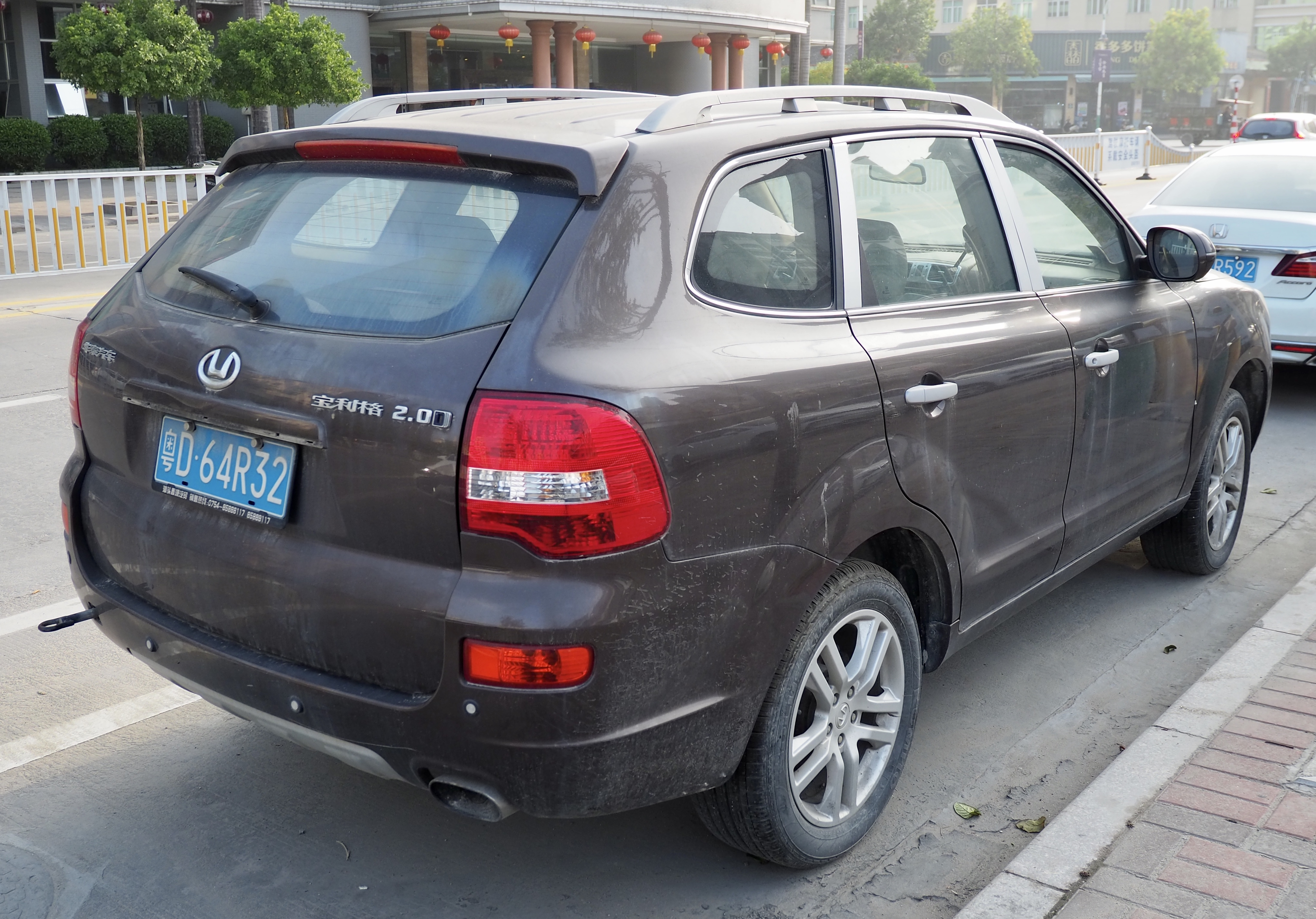
2011 Hawtai B35 Bolgheri 2.0L (rear)

The Hawtai Bolgheri originally debuted as a concept at the 2010 Beijing Auto Show.

The Hawtai Bolgheri was code named B35 during development phase, and the final compact crossover was named after the wine-producing town in Italy, Bolgheri (Baolige in Chinese). The Hawtai Bolgheri is a full-time four-wheel drive, and has two engine options including a Hawtai-made turbocharged diesel 2.0-liter (2.0TECV) producing 110 kW at 4000rpm and 310Nm at 2000rpm built with technology from Italy's VM Motori, and a turbocharged gasoline 1.8-liter (Kavachi 1.8T) from SAIC, producing 118 kW at 5500rpm and 215Nm at 2100-4500rpm, which also powers the Roewe 550. Gearbox options includes a 4-speed automatic transmission supplied by ZF from Germany or a 5-speed manual transmission. Front suspension employs MacPherson struts and the rear is multi-link type suspension.

As of July 2012, a Luxury Series of the Bolgheri was launched in China. As of September 2012, a Patriotic Edition of the Bolgheri was launched in China. The version features the same specifications as the standard model while sports a Chinese flag themed livery. As of April 2013, the Bolgheri S was launched in China as a sportier variant despite featuring the same powertrains.

=== 2016 facelift ===
The standard Bolgheri received a facelift for the 2016 Beijing Auto Show. The 2016 Bolgheri comes with engines including a 1.8-liter turbo engine and a 2.0-liter engine.

=== Hawtai Bolgheri Plus/ Hawtai Shengdafei 7/ Shendafei 7 XEV 520 ===
The Hawtai Bolgheri Plus (Baolige Plus) was unveiled on the 2016 Beijing Auto Show. The Baolige Plus is essentially an extensively facelifted variant of the standard Bolgheri crossover SUV. The Bolgheri Plus features an entire redesigned front end, new alloys, a new interior, and new rear lights. The Bolgheri Plus adds an additional 1.5 liter turbo engine producing 150 hp and 180 nm to the 1.8-liter turbo engine and a 2.0-liter engine of the standard 2016 model year Hawtai Bolgheri. Gearbox is a six-speed manual transmission or a six-speed automatic transmission. The interior of the Bolgheri Plus receives an additional 10.1 inch touch screen.

As of 2018, the Bolgheri Plus was renamed to Hawtai Shengdafei 7 to sit inline with the Shengdafei series crossovers. The model also spawned an electric version called the Shendafei 7 XEV 520 in 2018, and according to Hawtai, it has a range of 400 kilometers.
