= Hawtai =

Chinese automotive manufacturing company

Hawtai Motor Group
- Founded: Rongcheng, Shandong, China, 2000; 26 years ago
- Headquarters: Beijing, China
- Area served: China
- Key people: Richard Zhang (Vice President)
- Products: SUVs, sedans
- Owner: Zhāng Xiùgēn (张秀根)

Hawtai
- Simplified Chinese: 华泰
- Traditional Chinese: 華泰
Transcriptions
Standard Mandarin
- Hanyu Pinyin: Huátài

Hawtai Motor Group was a Chinese automotive manufacturing company headquartered in Beijing, with production facilities in Ordos, Inner Mongolia, and Rongcheng, Shandong. Selling cars and SUVs under the Hawtai brand, from 2002 to 2010 the company had a joint venture or other form of legal cooperation with Hyundai Motors that manufactured Hyundai-brand passenger cars for the mainland China market; Hawtai continued to use some Hyundai technology until its financial troubles forced its wind down of production capabilities in 2029, its bankruptcy in 2023 and eventual removal from the Chinese business register in 2026.

As of late 2010, its production capacity was reported to be 350,000 units/year. What distinguished Hawtai from rival private Chinese automakers was its diesel engine production ability. Billing itself as a clean vehicle brand, Hawtai also was a supplier to the Chinese State.

== Name ==
Although correctly romanized as Huátài in pinyin, and previously romanized as Huatai in branding, Hawtai is now the preferred way to spell the name of this Chinese automaker with the Latin alphabet.

== History ==
Founded in 2000, Hawtai Motor Group is, as of May 2011, owned by Zhang Xiugen, a Chinese entrepreneur. Initially producing an SUV, a 2002 cooperation with Hyundai allowed it to manufacture Hyundai-branded SUVs starting in 2003, which it also started selling under its own name in 2004. Only the engines may have differentiated these Hawtai-branded offerings. The company added sedans to its product line in 2010, and these are probably the first vehicles it both designed and manufactured.

Failed Saab bailout

Although it was never consummated, in early May 2011, Hawtai agreed to provide EUR 150 million to Spyker Cars, the then-current owner of Saab, in exchange for Chinese manufacturing rights to the new Saab 9-3 and a 30% ownership of this Swedish vehicle maker. The deal quickly fell through.

Technology transfers

Hawtai appears eager to absorb foreign technology, and the company has sought such transfers repeatedly, in the process gaining access to diesel engine and vehicle platform technologies. Around the time of the 2009 Chrysler Chapter 11 reorganization, this American automaker discussed the possibility of an asset sale with Hawtai.

In the early 2000s, Hawtai purchased technology from Hyundai Motors including some used in the first generation Santa Fe. The company sells a Hawtai-branded version of this small SUV as well as one of the Hyundai Terracan. c. 2010, both models used the same names as their Hyundai-branded counterparts, but by 2014 the Hawtai Santa Fe was being referred to as a Hawtai C9. The company does not appear reluctant to divulge the source of the intellectual property that appears in these vehicles; it refers to the C9 as a "Korean classic".

Hawtai utilizes engine technologies that were developed by other companies including some created by Italian diesel engine experts VM Motori.

Hyundai joint venture

In 2002, Hawtai began a licensing deal, partnership, or joint venture with Hyundai motors, but, as of late 2010, this has ceased. Hawtai continued to be referred to as a Hyundai partner as late as 2011, however. Regardless of the specific legal nature of the project, the Hyundai-Hawtai cooperation produced Chinese-market versions of several Hyundai models: the Hyundai Matrix, a people carrier, the Hyundai Santa Fe, and the Hyundai Terracan. The Santa Fe was the fifth most-purchased SUV in China in 2010, and at least some Hawtai versions of the car may differ significantly from those sold in other markets. Both Hyundai SUVs have experienced continued popularity in China. Hawtai's newest SUV, the B35 Bolgheri (Baolige in Chinese) utilizes Hyundai platform technology.

Proposed Proton collaboration

Between 2011 and 2012, a tie-up between Malaysian Proton and Hawtai was touted. This as-yet-incomplete deal may have originated at an ASEAN-sponsored business conference.

== Products ==
Hawtai currently produces the following vehicles:

EV:

- Shengdafei 2 XEV360
- Shengdafei 5 XEV260
- Shengdafei 5 XEV480
- Shengdafei 7 XEV520
- Lusheng S1 iEV360
- Lusheng S1 EV160B
- Lusheng S1 EV160R
- Lusheng S5 iEV230

ICE:

- Shengdafei 5
- Shengdafei 7
- Lusheng S5

Discontinued:

- B11 (1.8 and 2.0 litre)
- B21/E70 (2.0L Mitsubishi 4G63 & 4G94D, 1.5L turbocharged)
- Bolgheri (1.8 and 2.0 litre)
- Shengdafei (1.8 and 2.0 litre)
- Terracan (2.4 litre)
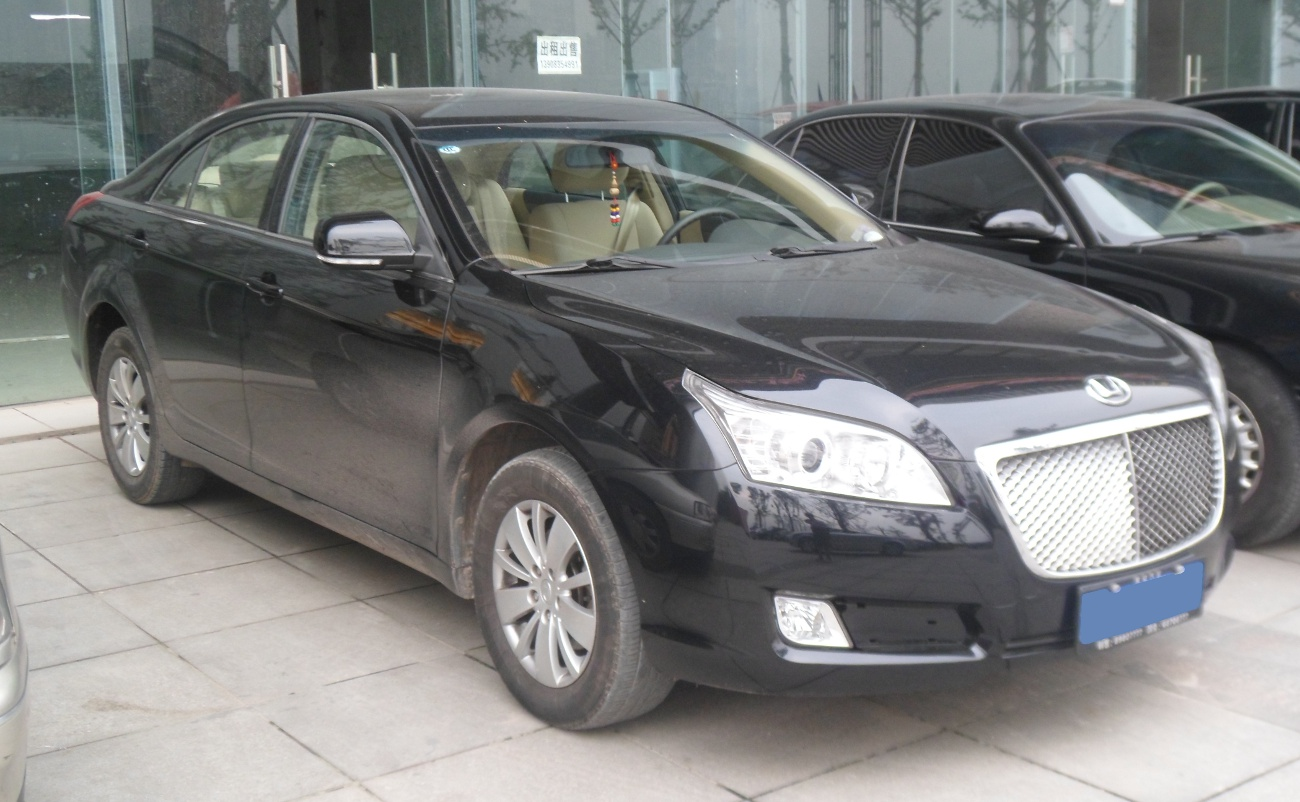
Hawtai B11

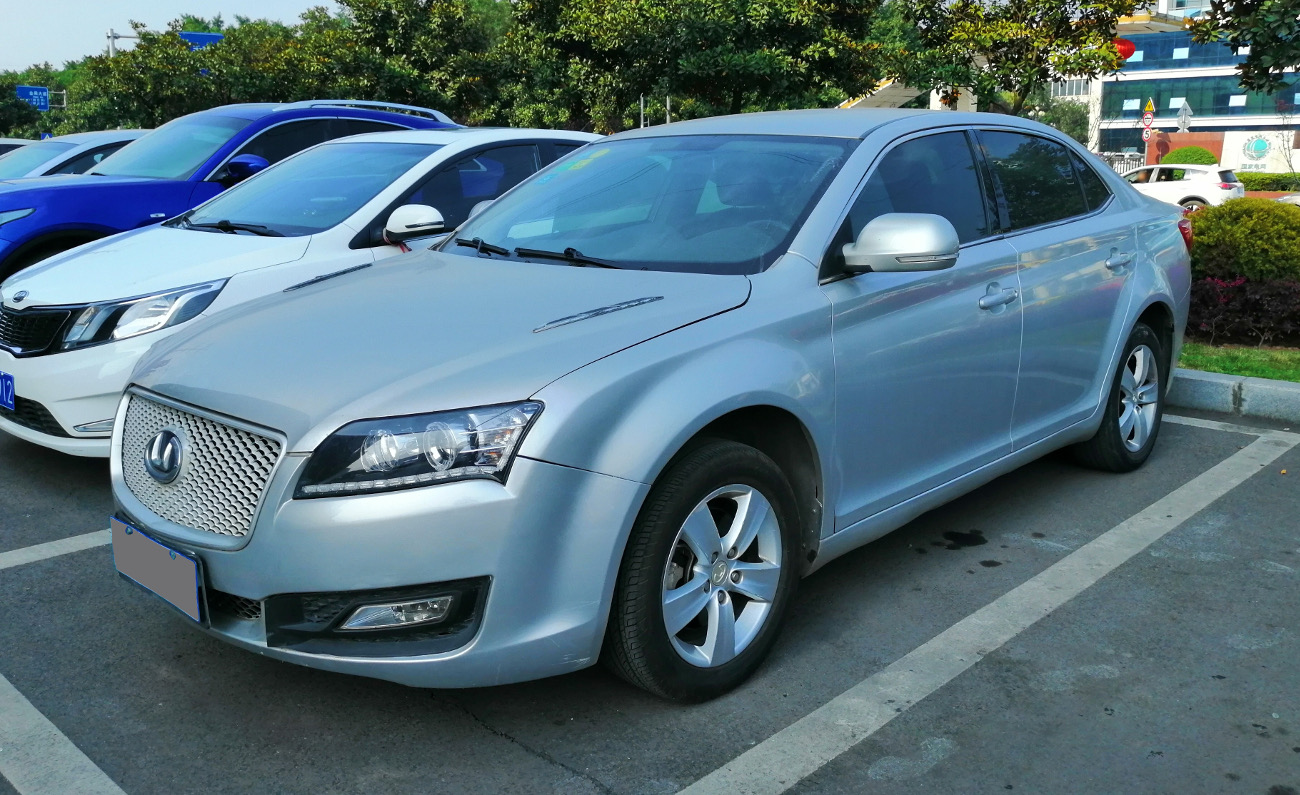
Hawtai E70

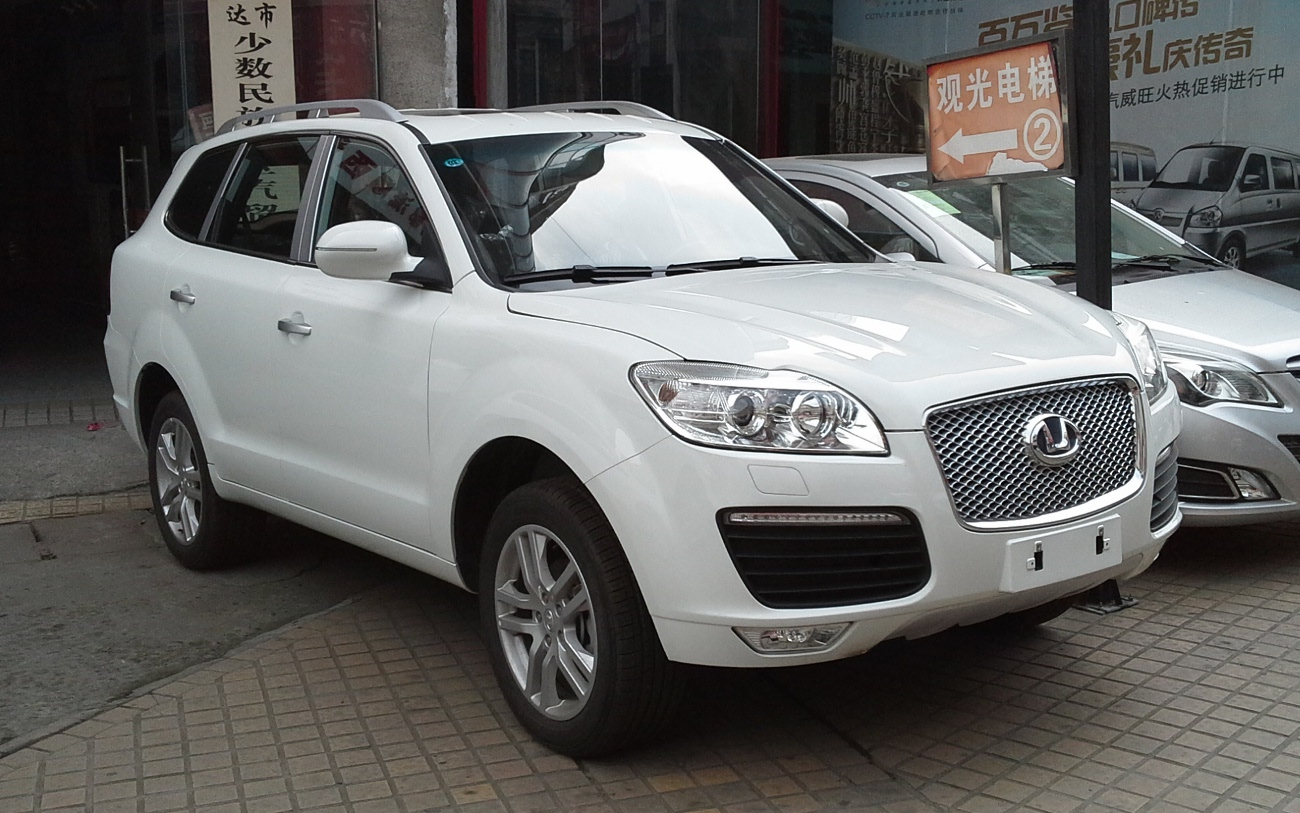
Hawtai Bolgheri B35

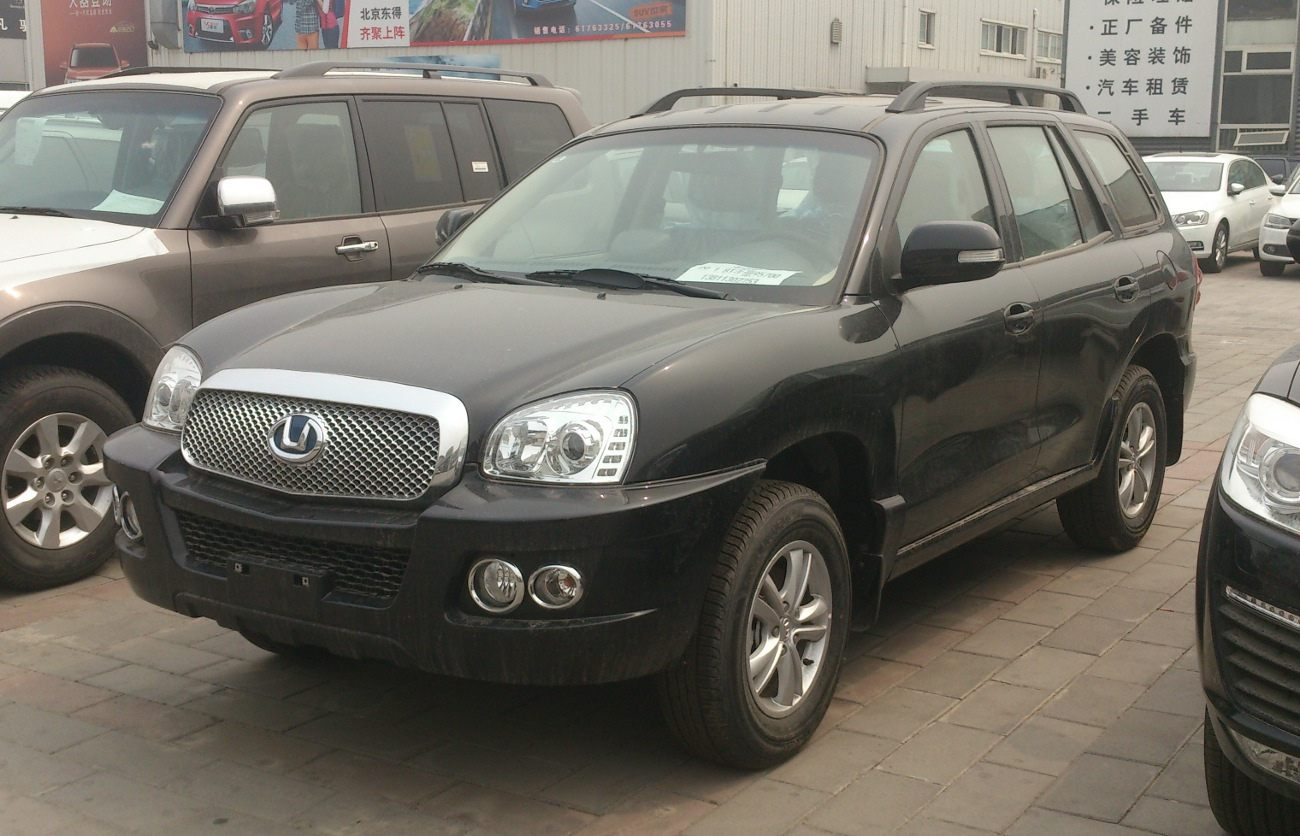
Hawtai Shendafei

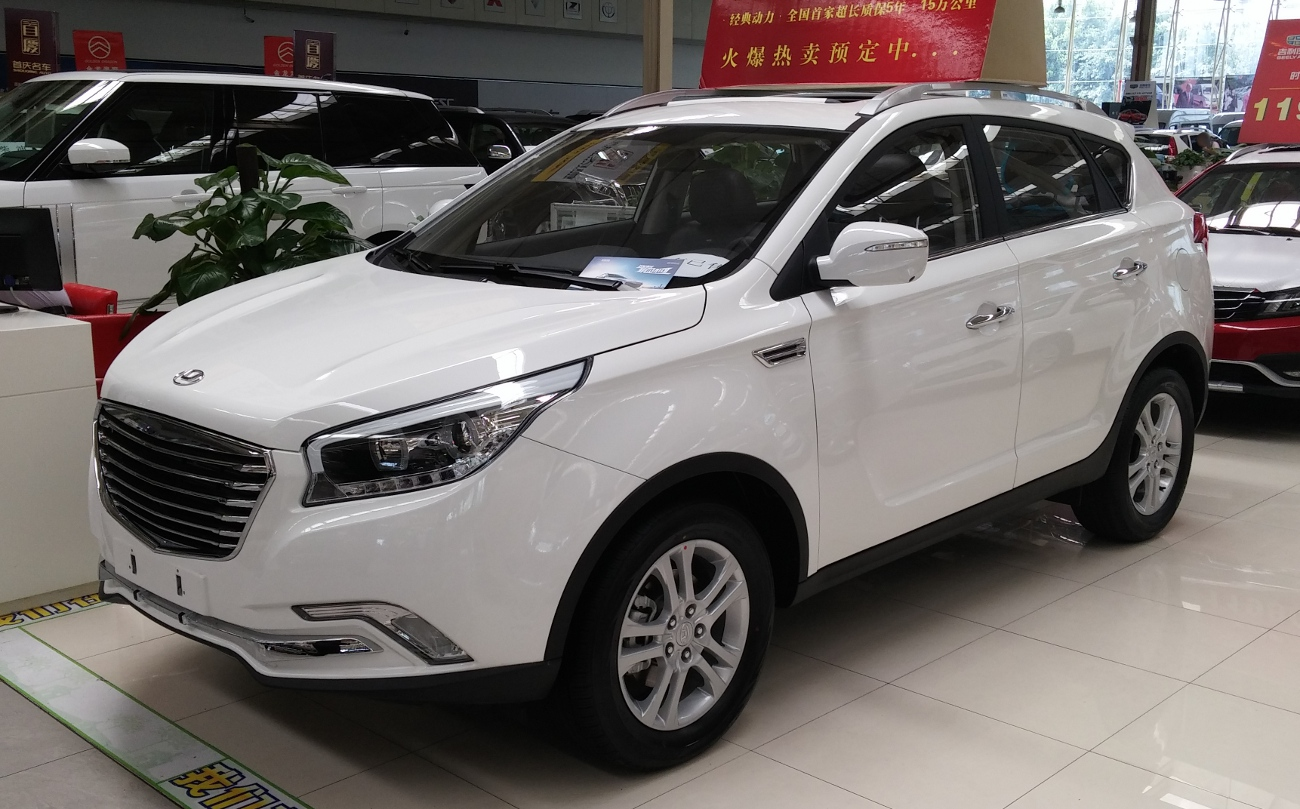
Hawtai Shendafei II

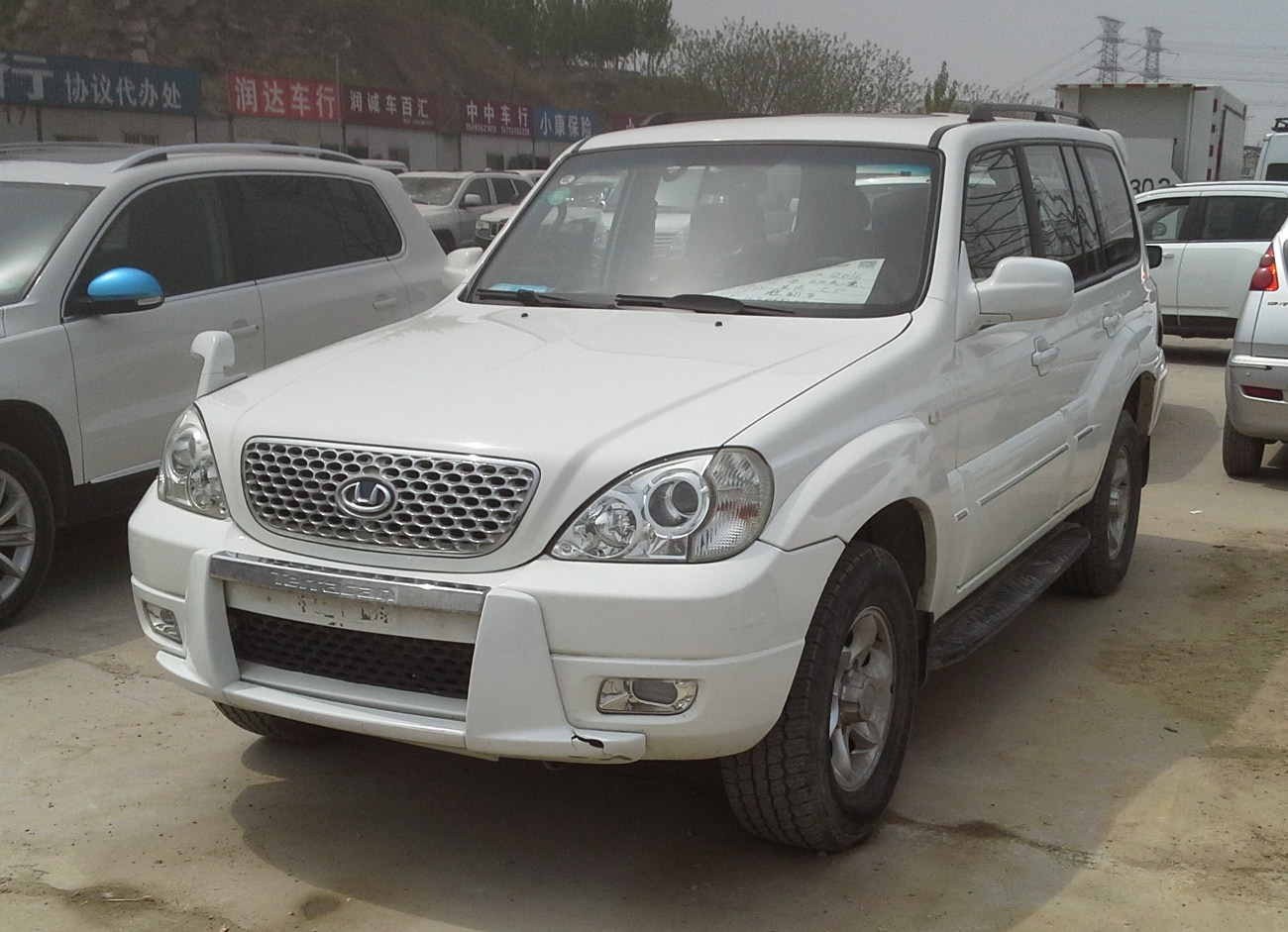
Hawtai Terracan

=== Engines ===
Some Hawtai models use SAIC Motor engines, but other powerplants are said to be Hawtai's own using technology purchased from Italian diesel experts VM Motori. The company states that the design of these engines, made at its Inner Mongolia site, has been modified in-house.

== Operations ==
Hawtai has passenger car production facilities in Ordos, Inner Mongolia, and Rongcheng, Shandong. The latter site has a 150,000 vehicles per year production capacity. The Inner Mongolia site has a production capacity of 300,000 units/year, manufactures modern diesel engines, and may have been under construction as of February 2010. Such production capacity figures may consider whole vehicles and engines as discrete. This facility produces transmissions as well as engines. Hawtai claims production capacity figures for this location of one million engines, 500,000 whole vehicles, and the same number of transmissions.

The company claims a bus production facility in Yanbian was established in 2002.

A former process technology/engine localization office in Beijing may be a site for R&D efforts.

== Sales ==
A total of 28,812 Hawtai passenger cars were sold in China in 2013, making it the 50th largest-selling car brand in the country in that year (and the 30th largest-selling Chinese brand).

=== Exports ===
The company has exported to Angola, southeast Asia, and one or more of the CIS nations, a grouping of former Soviet Bloc states. Hawtai has contacted at least one Russian automotive assembler, Derways, in an attempt to start CKD sales, and it has also explored the possibility of auto assembly at a soon-to-be-operational free trade zone in Valencia, Spain, signing an MoU with a Spanish mayor.
