= Hyundai Veracruz =

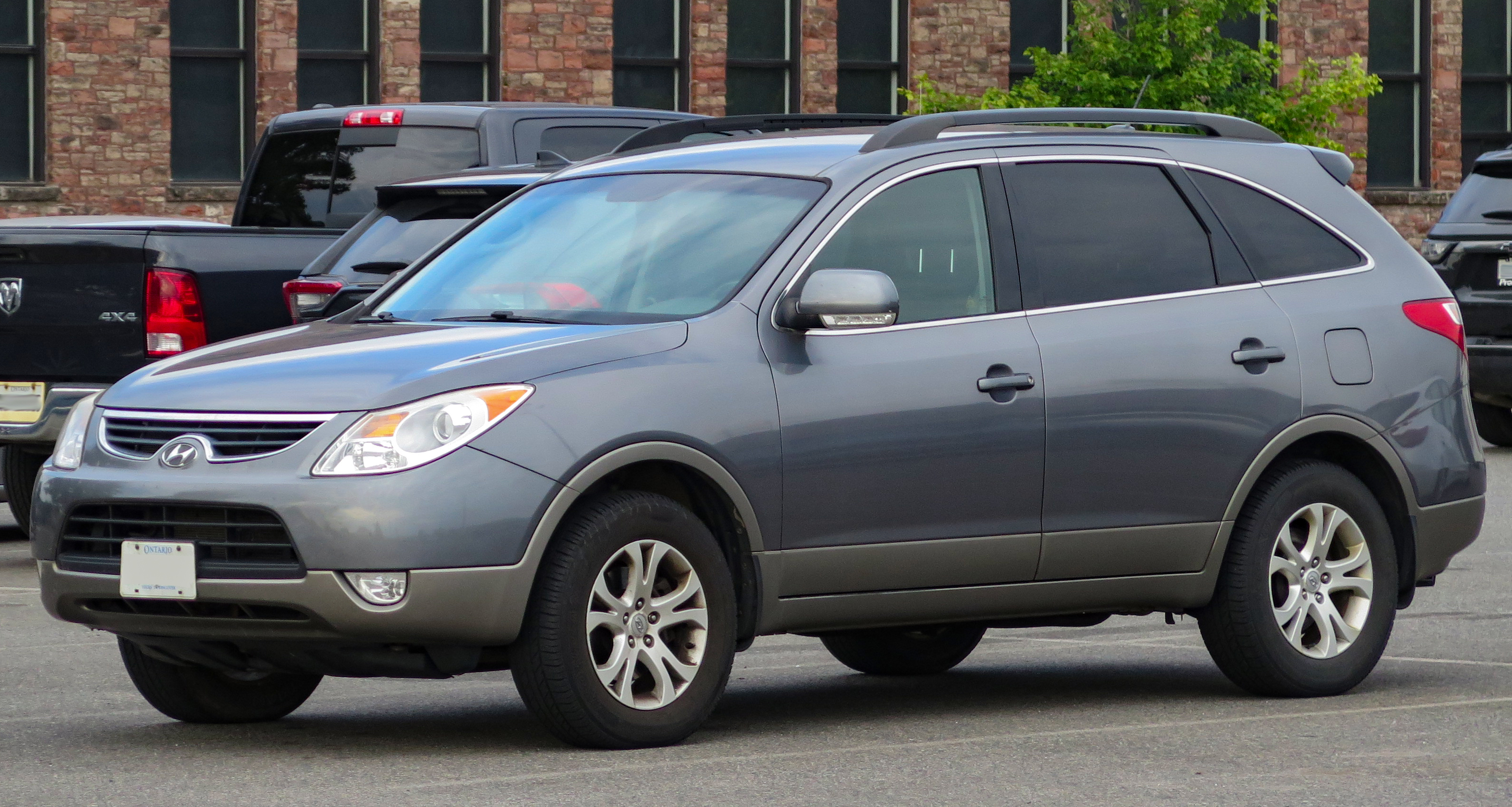
- 2012 Hyundai Veracruz GL AWD

Overview
- Manufacturer: Hyundai
- Model code: EN
- Also called: Hyundai ix55 (European Union and Russia)
- Production: 2006–2015
- Model years: 2007–2015
- Assembly: South Korea: Ulsan

Body and chassis
- Class: Mid-size Crossover SUV
- Body style: 5-door SUV
- Layout: Front-engine, front-wheel-drive or four-wheel-drive
- Related: Hyundai Santa Fe; Hyundai Sonata; Hyundai Grandeur; Kia Optima; Kia Carens; Kia Sorento

Powertrain
- Engine: Petrol: 3.8 L Lambda CVVT V6; Diesel: 3.0 L S CRDi-VGT V6; 3.0 L S II CRDi-VGT V6
- Transmission: 6-speed automatic

Dimensions
- Wheelbase: 2,805 mm (110.4 in)
- Length: 4,840 mm (190.6 in)
- Width: 1,945–1,970 mm (76.6–77.6 in)
- Height: 1,750–1,810 mm (68.9–71.3 in)
- Curb weight: 1,970–2,115 kg (4,343–4,663 lb)

Chronology
- Predecessor: Hyundai Terracan
- Successor: Hyundai Maxcruz / Santa Fe (LWB)

The Hyundai Veracruz (Korean: 현대 베라크루즈), also known as the Hyundai ix55 in the European Union and Russia, is a mid-size crossover that was manufactured by the South Korean manufacturer Hyundai from 2006 to 2015. The Veracruz was sold in the United States, Canada, South Korea, China, Morocco, South America and the Middle East.

It was also imported to Europe and parts of Asia from 2007 to 2011. The Veracruz was discontinued in other countries, except South Korea. Its name refers to the Mexican state of Veracruz; however, despite being named after the Mexican state, it was never actually sold in Mexico.

== History ==
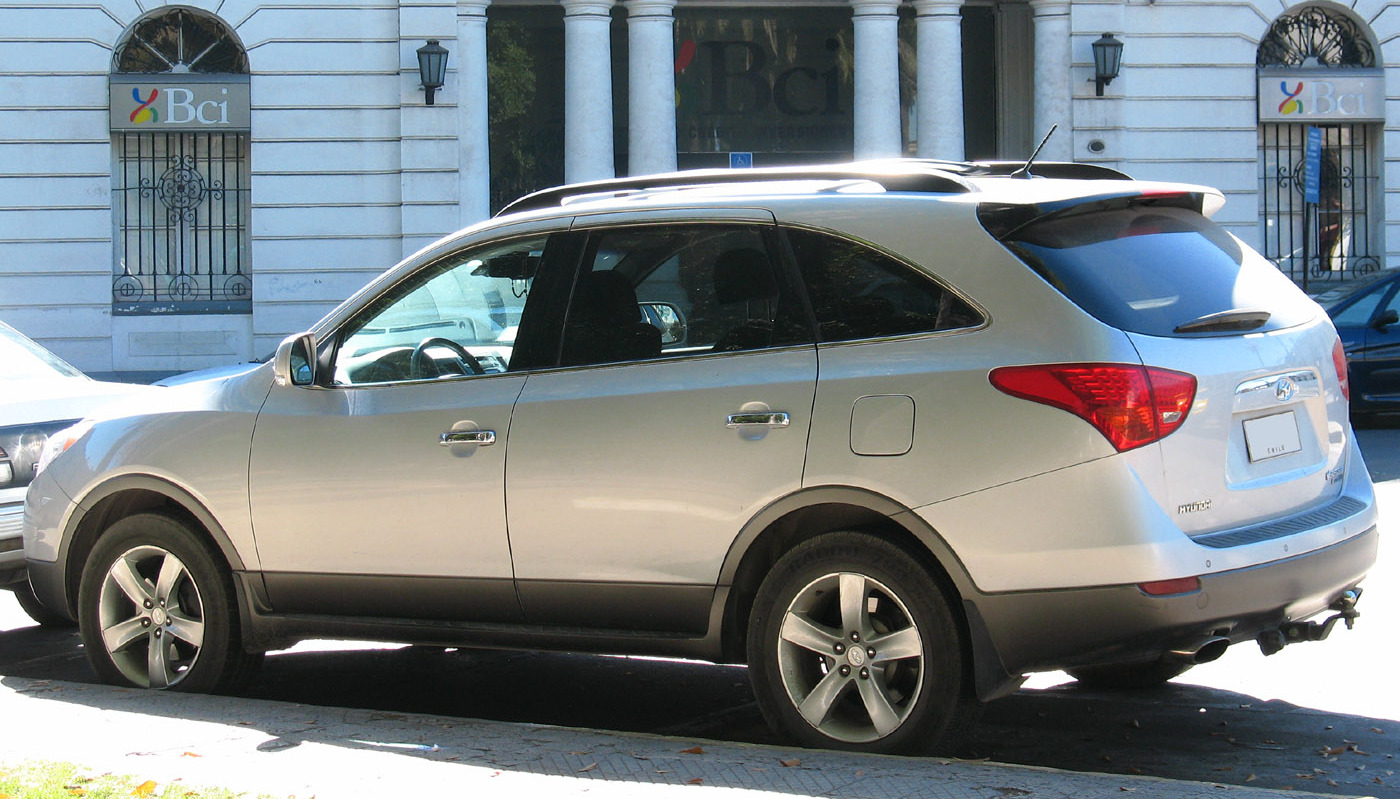
2007 Hyundai Veracruz 3.0 CRDi

The official date of unveiling in South Korea was October 12, 2006, and was made available in the United States as a 2007 model. The Veracruz went on sale in March 2007, and is Hyundai's largest crossover SUV.

It replaced the truck based Terracan that was sold worldwide except for North America. The Veracruz is built on a Hyundai Santa Fe platform. The revamped 2011 Veracruz was based on the same platform as the Kia Sorento.

The Veracruz gets its name from a state in Mexico, continuing the Western theme from the small Tucson SUV and mid-size Hyundai Santa Fe SUV. Powering the Veracruz is a 3.8 L 260 hp (190 kW) V6 engine with an Aisin sourced six speed Shiftronic automatic transmission.

In Europe, it was sold only with a 3.0 L CRDI V6 diesel S-Line engine with a variable geometry turbocharger and 240 hp (180 kW). In 2008, the Veracruz was also sold in some European countries as the ix55.

== Features and options ==
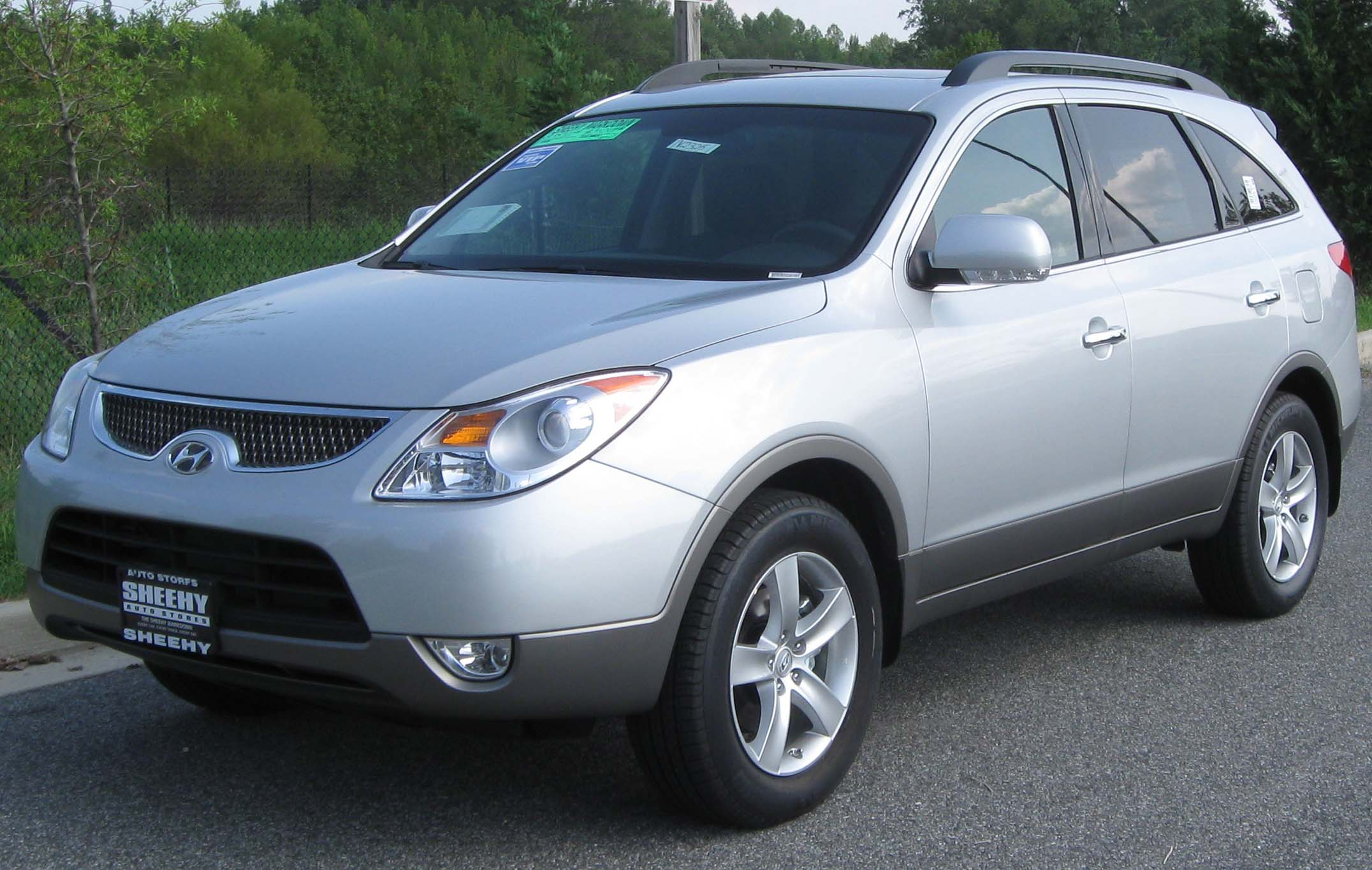
2010 Hyundai Veracruz Limited (North America)

The Veracruz was available in 3 models during its six-year run: the base GLS, the SE and the luxurious Limited, in Front Wheel Drive or All Wheel Drive configurations.

Standard features on all Veracruz models included full power equipment, air conditioning with allergen filter, an AM/FM stereo with SiriusXM Satellite Radio, CD/MP3 player, USB and auxiliary inputs for portable media devices, steering wheel mounted audio system and cruise controls, third row seating, aluminium alloy wheels, a V6 engine, an automatic transmission, and colour keyed side mirrors and door handles.

Additional options included a six disc, in dash CD/MP3 changer, Infinity surround sound, leather trimmed seating surfaces, heated and ventilated seats, a power sunroof, smart key access (featuring a "Twist to Start" ignition system), chrome accents, and touch screen GPS Navigation with SiriusXM Travel Link service.

One feature that was not available from the factory on any Veracruz model was a Bluetooth hands free telephone system, though one was available as an accessory through Hyundai that replaced the sunglasses holder in the overhead console.

However, the optional Bluetooth hands free accessory kit did not support A2DP wireless stereo streaming of music, as it did not integrate into the Veracruz's audio system, and instead featured its own, integral control panel and speaker.

=== Discontinuation ===
The Hyundai Veracruz was discontinued on November 15, 2011, in other countries except South Korea. The last produced models in 2011 were 2012 models, and carried over the extended year.

Hyundai announced on April 6, 2012, that the seven passenger version of the new 2013 Hyundai Santa Fe will replace the Veracruz, and that production of the current Veracruz would stop "around November 2012".

In 2015, the South Korean version was discontinued due to Euro 6 emission standards.

== Safety ==
The Insurance Institute for Highway Safety (IIHS) said crash results indicated, "... a low risk of any significant injuries in a crash of this severity" which is the highest result possible. The U.S. National Highway Traffic Safety Administration (NHTSA) found similar results when they tested the Veracruz, awarding it five stars after its frontal crash test for both passenger and driver and in the side impact event.

On November 15, 2007, the IIHS declared Veracruz vehicles built after August 2007 a Best Safety Pick for side, rear, and frontal impact protection.
