= Hawtai Lusheng E70 =

Hawtai E70
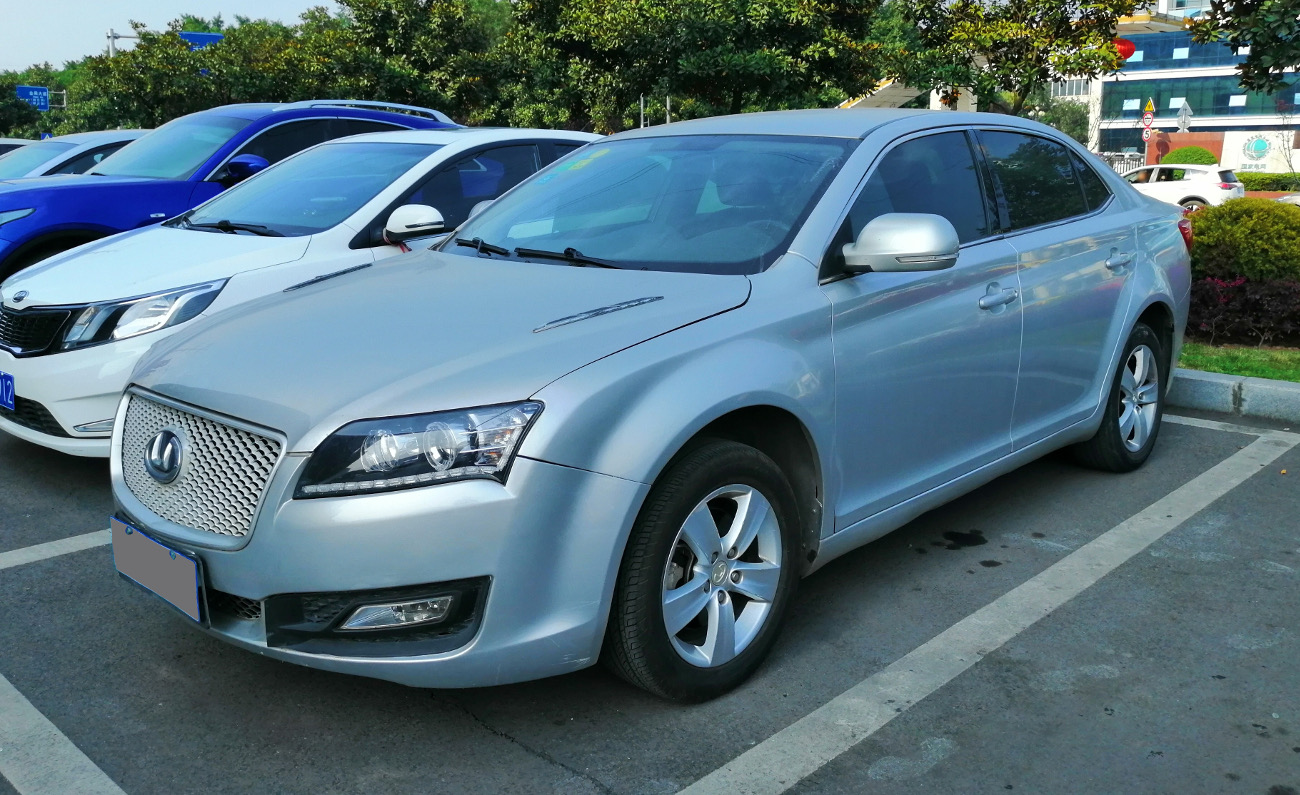
- Hawtai Lusheng E70

Overview
- Manufacturer: Hawtai
- Also called: Hawtai B21; Hawtai Lusheng E70; Hawtai Lusheng E80; Hawtai Lusheng S5 (Electric)
- Production: 2013–2018
- Assembly: Rongcheng, Shandong, China

Body and chassis
- Body style: 4-door sedan
- Layout: Front-engine, front-wheel-drive

Powertrain
- Engine: 2.0 L Mitsubishi 4G63/4G94D I4 (petrol); 1.5 L OED383Q I4 (TD)
- Electric motor: One 80 kW (107 hp; 109 PS)
- Power output: 136 PS (100 kW; 134 hp) (4G63); 147 PS (108 kW; 145 hp) (4G63); 93 PS (68 kW; 92 hp) (OED383Q); 109 PS (80 kW; 108 hp) (EV)
- Transmission: 4-speed automatic 5-speed manual
- Battery: 39 kWh Li-ion (Hawtai Lusheng S5 iEV230); 55 kWh Li-ion (Hawtai Lusheng S5 EV330)
- Electric range: 230 km (140 mi) (Hawtai Lusheng S5 iEV230); 330 km (210 mi) (Hawtai Lusheng S5 EV330)

Dimensions
- Wheelbase: 2,678 mm (105.4 in)
- Length: 4,777 mm (188.1 in)
- Width: 1,794 mm (70.6 in)
- Height: 1,481 mm (58.3 in)

The Hawtai E70 or Hawtai Lusheng E70 (华泰 路盛 E70) is a mid-size sedan produced by Chinese auto maker Hawtai.

== Overview ==
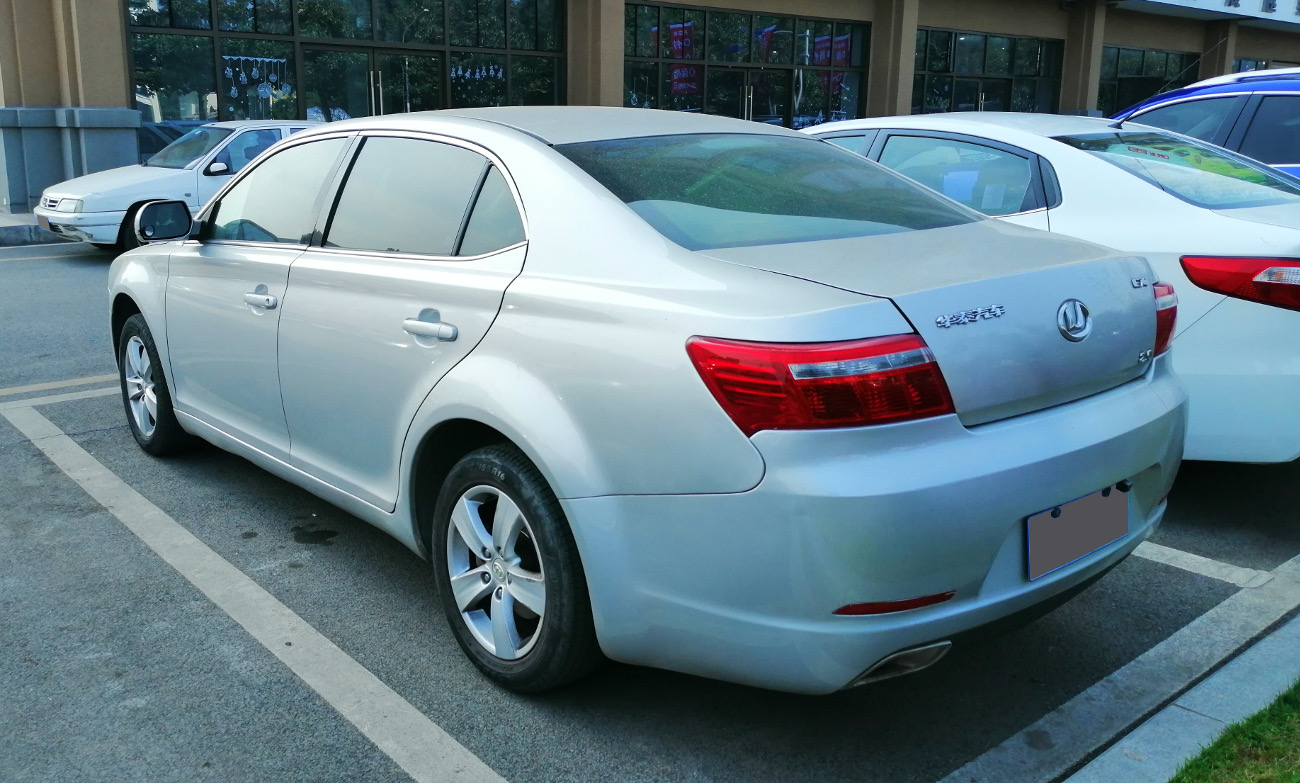
Hawtai E70 (rear)

The Hawtai E70 was previewed as the Hawtai B21 concept on the 2010 Beijing Auto Show. The production version called the Lusheng E70 was launched on the Chinese car market in March 2013.

Power of the E70 comes from a 2.0 liter engine putting out 129 hp and 180 nm of torque through a 5-speed manual transmission or 4-speed automatic transmission powering the front wheels. The E70 features Macpherson front suspension and multi-link at rear. The petrol and diesel powered models were renamed to E80, while the electric model introduced in 2016 was renamed the Lusheng S5 iEV230.

=== Hawtai Lusheng E80/ Lusheng S5 ===
The Hawtai Lusheng E80 was revealed in 2016 as an update of the E70. The E80 is powered by a single 1.5 liter diesel inline-4 DOHC engine, and in 2017 the model was renamed to Lusheng E5.

=== Hawtai Lusheng S5 iEV230/ Hawtai Lusheng S5 EV330 ===
The Hawtai Lusheng S5 iEV230 is the electric variant of the Lusheng S5, and is powered by a 39 kWh electric motor. As the model name suggests, it has a battery range of 230 km (140 mi)

The Hawtai Lusheng S5 EV330 pure electric vehicle is a battery electric concept car launched in 2018. The S5 EV330 is equipped with a 55 kWh battery delivering a range of 330 km (210 mi)rated by NEDC. The drivetrain of the S5 EV330s produces 107 hp (80 kW), and 220 N.m (162.3 lb.ft) of torque with a top speed of 130 km/h / 81 mph.

== Export markets ==
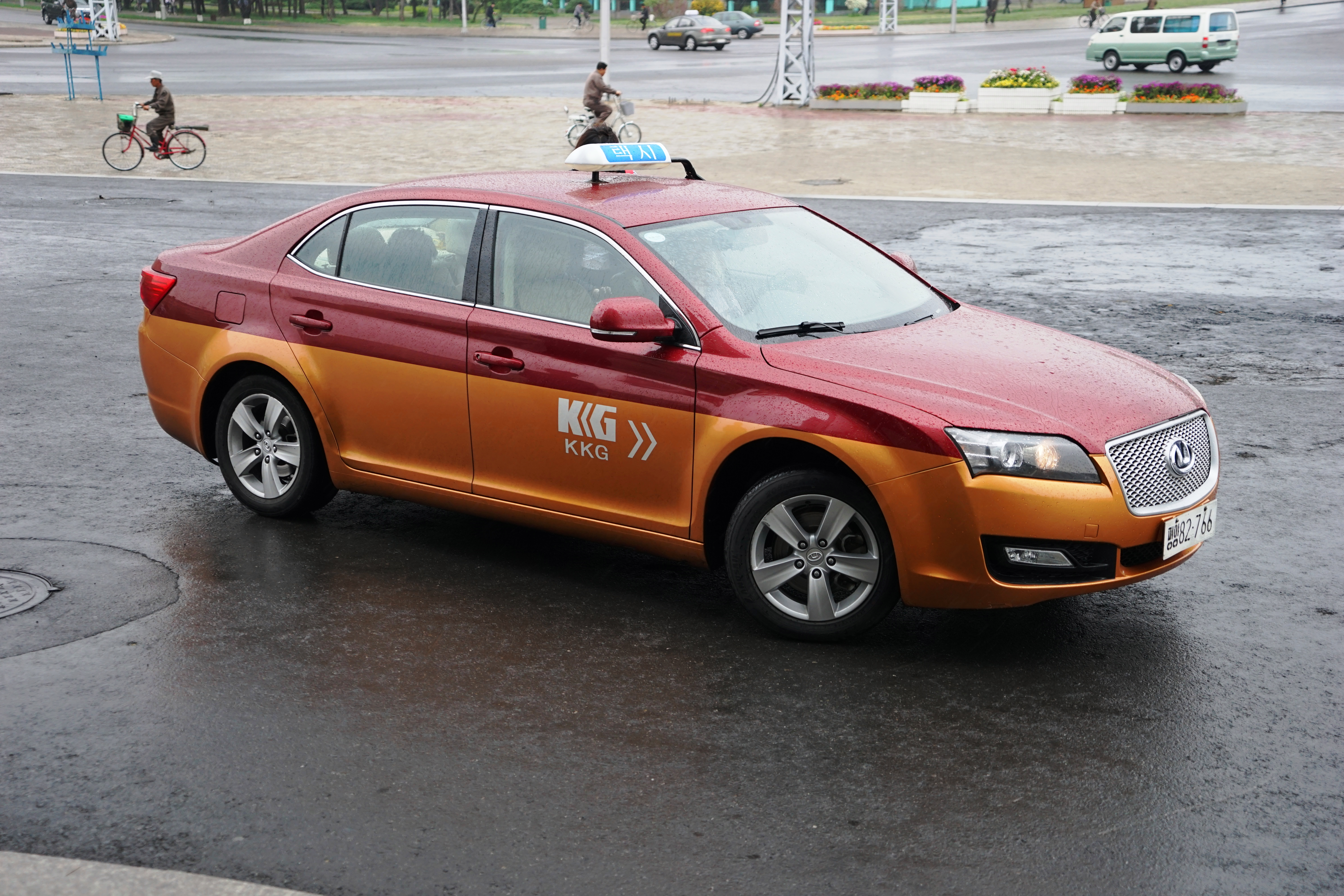
Hawtai E70 taxi in Pyongyang, North Korea

As a brand Hawtai has been relatively active on the export front as of 2013, with Chinese automotive media listing North Korea, Iraq, Libya, Jordan, Russia, Egypt and Angola as the main export countries. In December 2013, Hawtai Motor exported 300 Hawtai Lusheng E70 taxis to North Korea with the taxis being deployed in the North Korean capital of Pyongyang.
