= Hawtai Shengdafei =

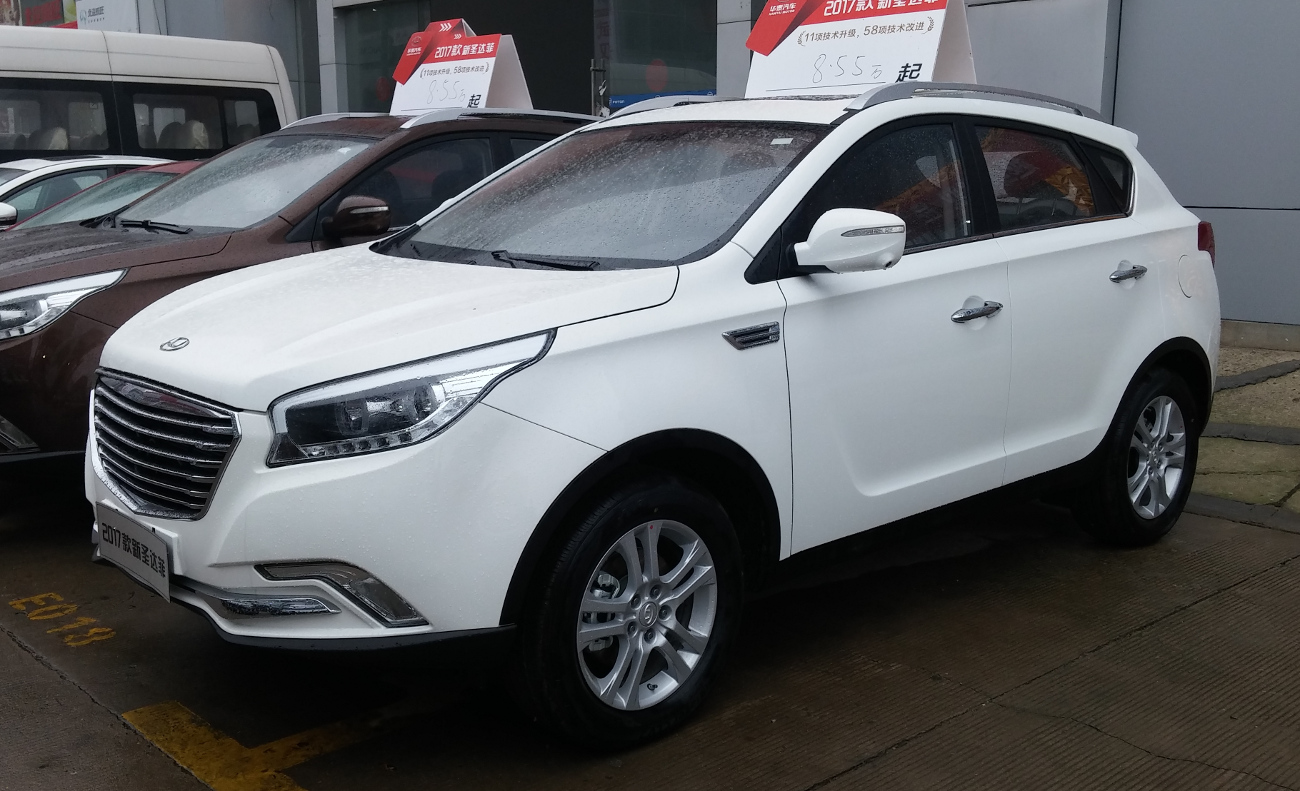

Overview
- Manufacturer: Hawtai
- Production: 2009–2023
- Model years: 2009–2023

Body and chassis
- Class: Mid-size crossover SUV (2009–2015); Compact crossover SUV (2015–2023)
- Body style: 5-door SUV
- Layout: Front-engine, front-wheel-drive

The Hawtai Shengdafei (Chinese: 华泰圣达菲; pinyin: Huá tài shèng dá fēi) is a compact crossover SUV produced by the Chinese manufacturer Hawtai from 2009 to 2023. It is named to sound similar to the Chinese name of the Hyundai Santa Fe.

== First generation (2009–2015) ==
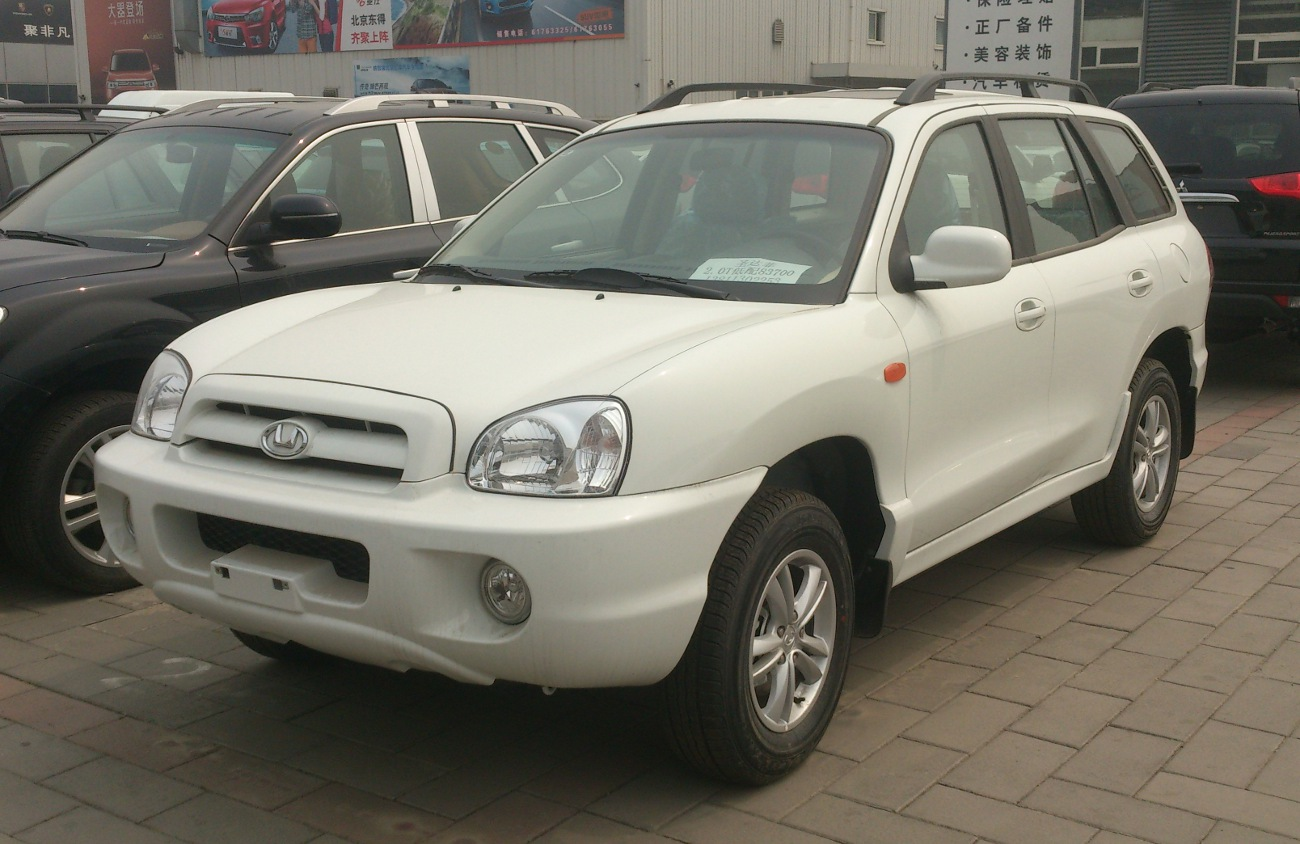

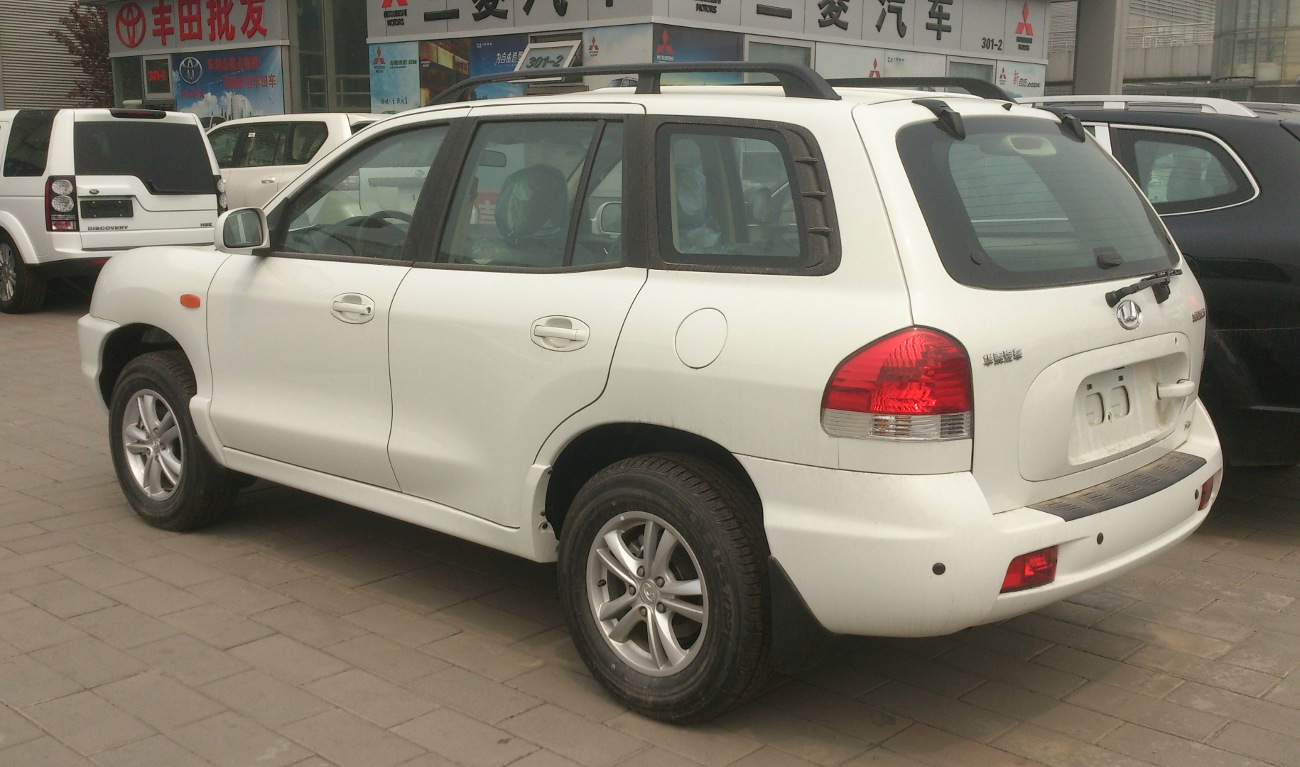
Hawtai Shengdafei

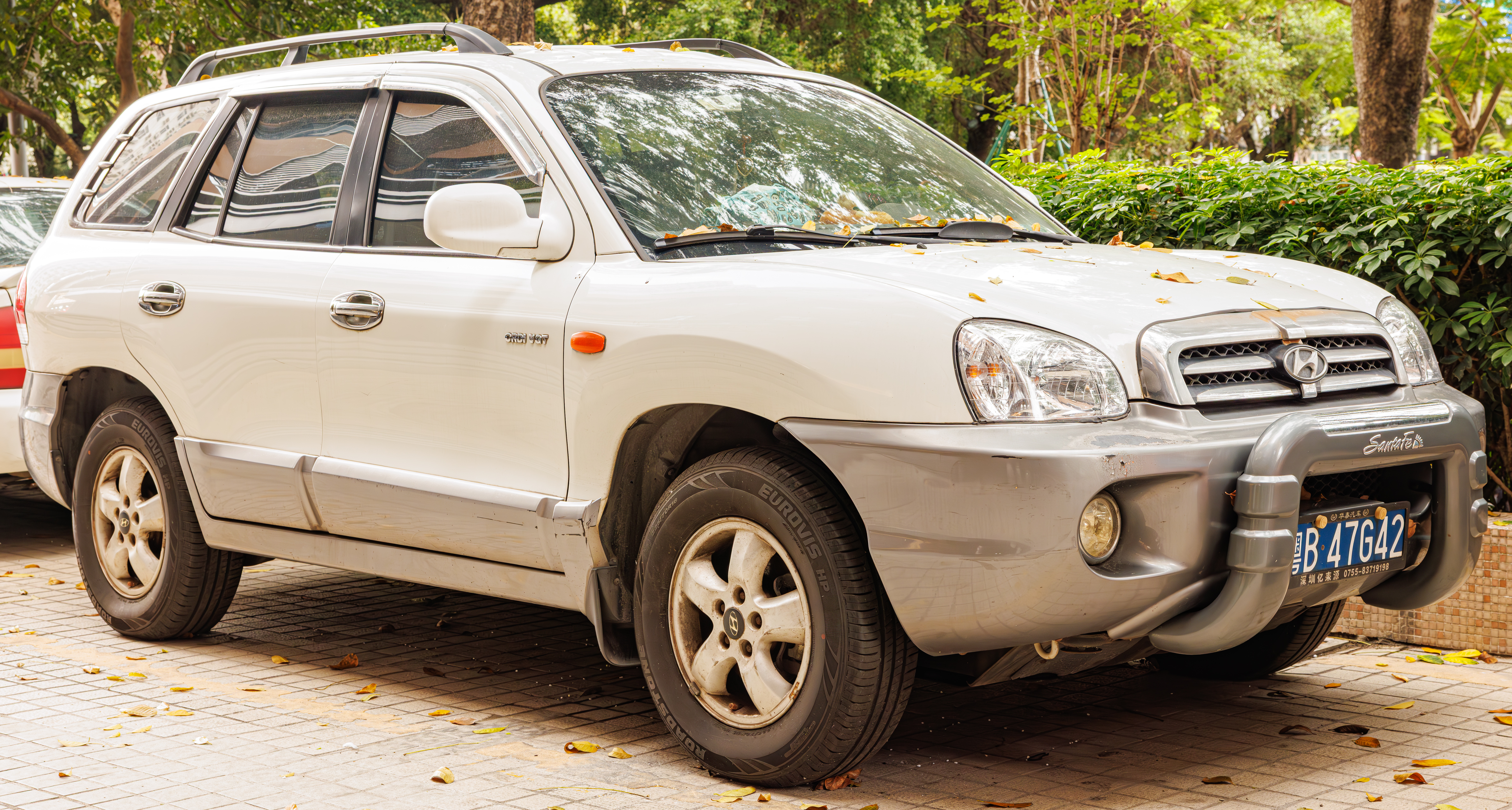
Hawtai Shengdafei first facelift

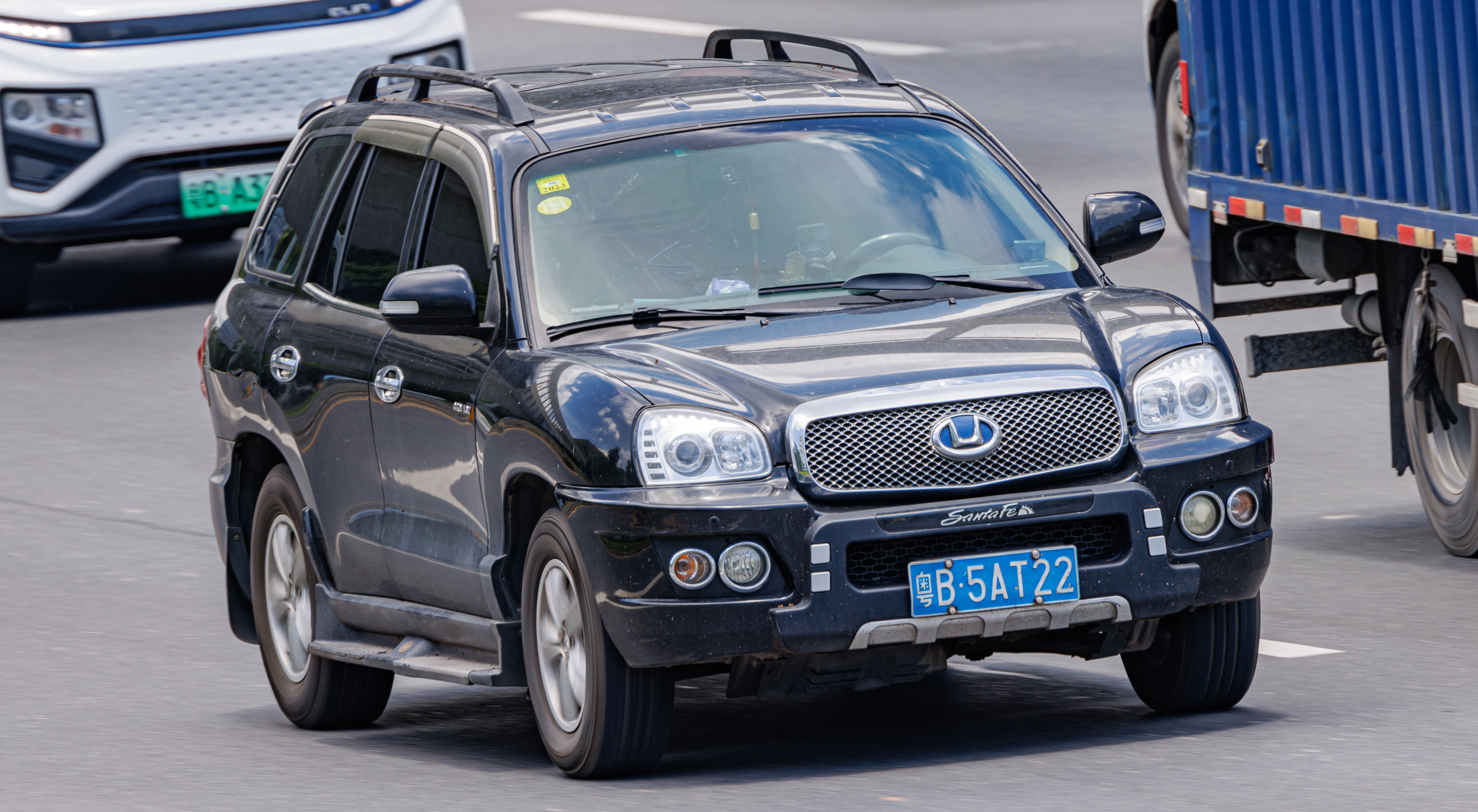
Hawtai Shengdafei second facelift

Hawtai Motor manufactured the first-generation Hyundai Santa Fe starting from 2006 which is part of a joint venture that began in 2002. One of the versions Hawtai debuted under its own brand name in 2009 was the Shengdafei or Santa Fe C9. Utilizing a Rover-acquired engine, it may have been priced at a significant discount to those bearing the Hyundai name.

Hyundai ended its partnership with Hawtai in 2010 and production of the first generation Shengdafei ended in 2015.

== Second generation (2015–2023) ==
Hawtai Shengdafei II
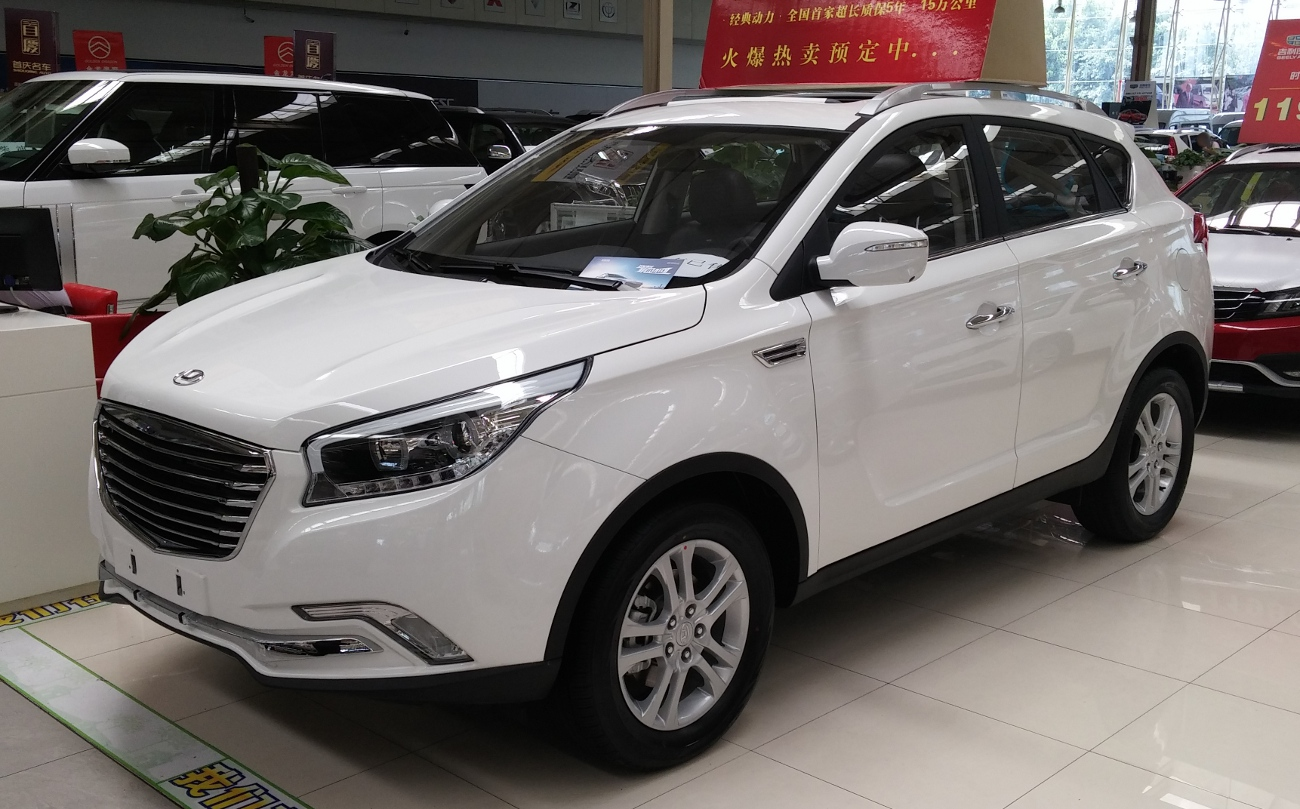

Overview
- Also called: Hawtai A 25; Hawtai Laville; Hawtai Shengdafei 5 Hawtai Shengdafei 5XEV260; Hawtai Shengdafei 5XEV480
- Production: 2015–2017 (Shengdafei); 2017–2023 (Shengdafei 5)
- Model years: 2015–2017 (Shengdafei); 2017–2023 (Shengdafei 5)
- Assembly: Beijing, China

Powertrain
- Engine: 1.5 L I4 turbo petrol 2.0 L I4 diesel
- Transmission: 5-speed manual 6-speed manual 4-speed semi-automatic transmission 5-speed automatic

Dimensions
- Wheelbase: 2,660 mm (104.7 in)
- Length: 4,426 mm (174.3 in)
- Width: 1,862 mm (73.3 in)
- Height: 1,709 mm (67.3 in)
- Curb weight: 1,450 kg (3,197 lb)

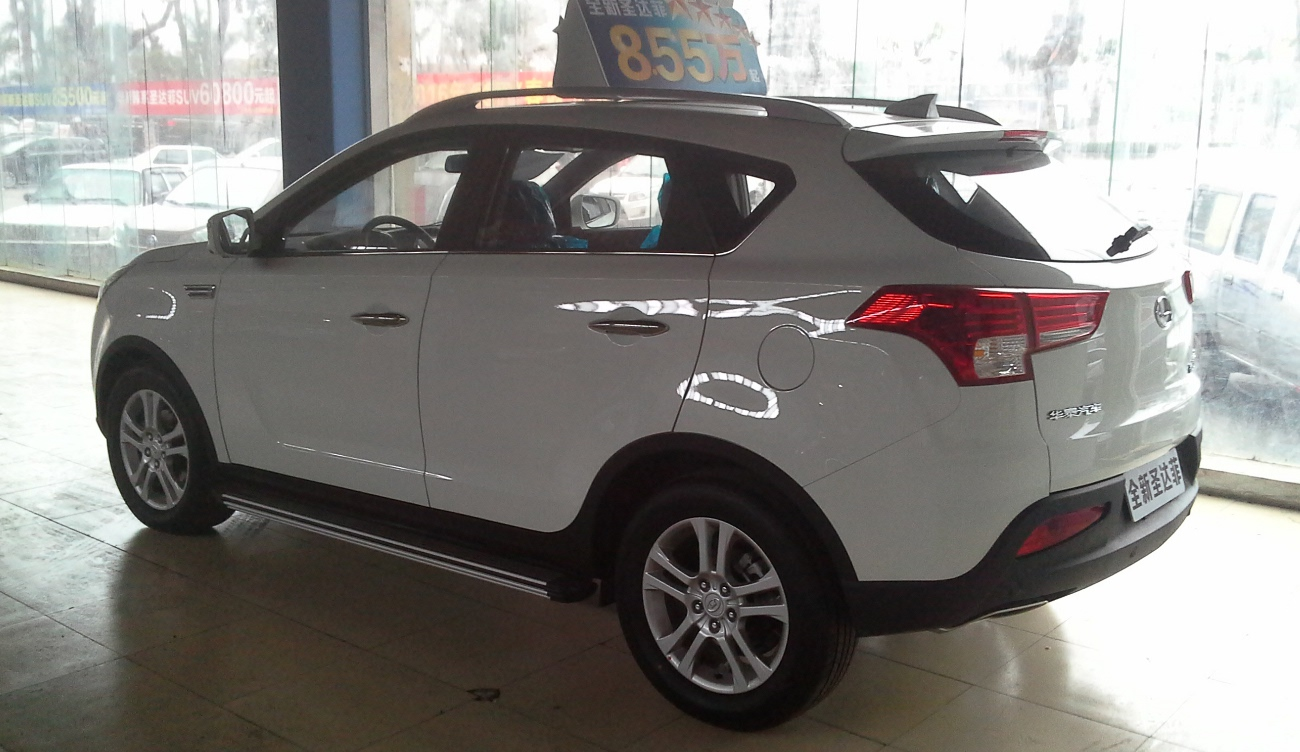
Hawtai Shengdafei II rear quarter view

The second generation Hawtai Shengdafei debuted during the 2014 Beijing Auto Show. Previously known as the Hawtai A25, the Hawtai Shengdafei was positioned under the Hawtai Baolige. The second generation Hawtai Shengdafei was powered by a 1.5 liter turbocharged four-cylinder petrol engine producing 135 hp (101 kW; 137 PS) and 200 N⋅m (148 lb⋅ft) of torque and a 2.0 liter turbo-diesel engine. Transmission options include a 5-speed manual gearbox and a 4-speed automatic gearbox.

A facelift for the second generation Hawtai Shengdafei was introduced during the 2017 Shanghai Auto Show slightly updating the exterior and interior of the model. As of August 2017, the model was launched as the Hawtai Shengdafei 5, with the original Hawtai Shengdafei name being transformed into a whole series of products.

The 1.5 liter turbocharged four-cylinder petrol engine power increased to 154 hp (115 kW; 156 PS) at 5,500 rpm and 215 N⋅m (159 lb⋅ft) of torque at 2,000 rpm and is paired with a 6-speed manual or a 4-speed automatic transmission.

The Hawtai Shengdafei 5 also spawned electric variants including the Hawtai Shengdafei 5XEV 260 and Hawtai Shengdafei 5XEV 480 featuring blue accents that differentiates from the internal combustion engine version.
