= Hyundai Galloper =

Full-size SUV

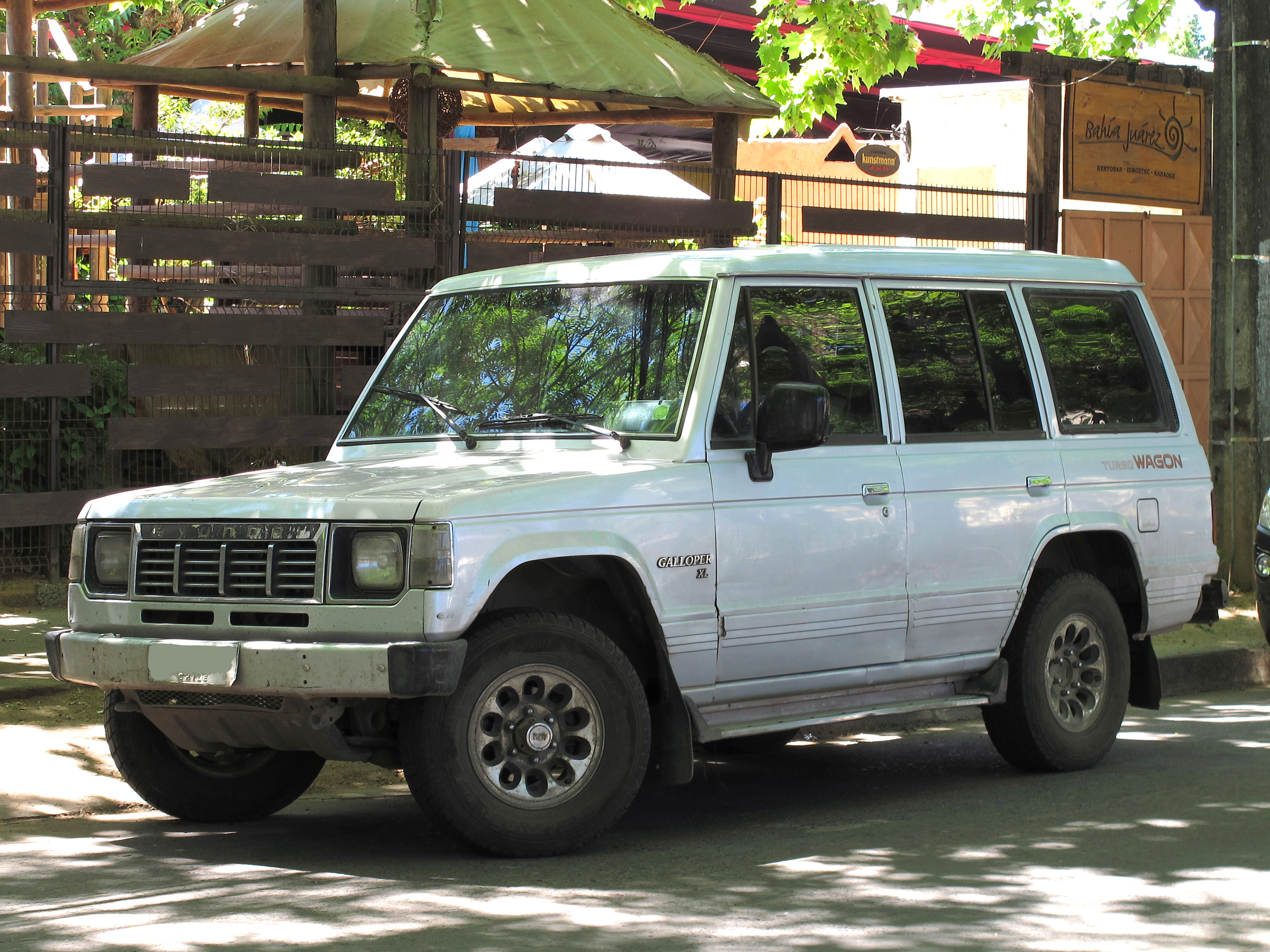
- 1996 Galloper XL (1st generation, facelifted)

Overview
- Manufacturer: Hyundai; Mitsubishi Motors
- Also called: Galloper Exceed; Galloper Safari; Asia Galloper (Brazil); Galloper TCI (Iceland); Mitsubishi Pajero; Mitsubishi Galloper; Hawtai Jitian (China)
- Production: 1991–2004
- Assembly: South Korea: Ulsan (Hyundai Precision Industry, Co. Ltd.); China: Beijing

Body and chassis
- Class: Full-size SUV
- Body style: 3/5-door SUV
- Layout: Front-engine, four-wheel-drive
- Related: Mitsubishi Pajero

Powertrain
- Engine: 3.0 L G6AT V6 (petrol); 2.5 L D4BH I4 (diesel)
- Transmission: 4-speed automatic 5-speed manual

Dimensions
- Wheelbase: 2,350 mm (93 in) SWB; 2,695 mm (106 in) LWB
- Length: 3,945 mm (155 in) SWB; 4,545 mm (179 in) LWB STD; 4,605 mm (181 in) LWB XL; 4,615 mm (182 in) LWB TCI&GSL
- Width: 1,770 mm (69.7 in)
- Height: 1,859 mm (73.2 in)

Chronology
- Successor: Hyundai Terracan

The Hyundai Galloper (Korean: 갤로퍼; RR: Gaellopeo), also known as the Galloper Exceed, Galloper Innovation, Mitsubishi Galloper, Asia Galloper or Hawtai Jitian, is a full-size SUV manufactured by the South Korean manufacturer Hyundai from 1991 to 2004. It is a localised version of the first-generation Mitsubishi Pajero.

== History ==
Chung Mong-koo spearheaded the localisation of the Galloper while leading the Hyundai Precision and Industry Co., Ltd. division of the Hyundai Group. Reportedly, Chung Mong-koo had been asked by Chung Ju-young, his father and the chairman of the Hyundai Group, why he was leaving Hyundai Motor, which at the time was led by his uncle (Chung Ju-young's brother Chung Se-yong), to make a four wheel-drive vehicle. Chung Mong-koo replied that Hyundai Motor was a sedan-oriented company and resistant to developing a utility vehicle; by adding to the breadth of products offered by Hyundai, Chung Mong-koo saw benefits to the Group and the Korean market as a whole.

Hyundai Precision initially worked with Roush Enterprises to develop a four wheel-drive utility vehicle, but the resulting X-100 ECS ROUSH never made it to market after test audiences panned it. Hyundai Precision then selected the Mitsubishi Pajero for localization to the Korean market. Hyundai Precision razed Yeompo-dong No. 2, a container factory that was originally completed in 1989, and rebuilt it as a dedicated automobile factory.

Demand for Gallopers, especially early models, has appreciated since the early 2010s, with nostalgic customers willing to spend more than ₩30 million to restore vehicles purchased for a twentieth of the price. Mohenic Garage (Korean: 모헤닉게라지스) produced restomod Gallopers as the Mohenic G, at a cost of up to ₩85 million (US$80,000), taking up to 12 months to complete; the company's founder, Henie Kim (김태성), was inspired to start the business in 2013 after being dissatisfied with new cars he could take camping: "I was looking for a car that could set me free. When I found an old Hyundai Galloper, I remembered how much I loved the car as a college student." However, because of the engine's obsolete pollution control system, access to central districts in Seoul while driving a Galloper was restricted starting in 2021.

=== Design ===
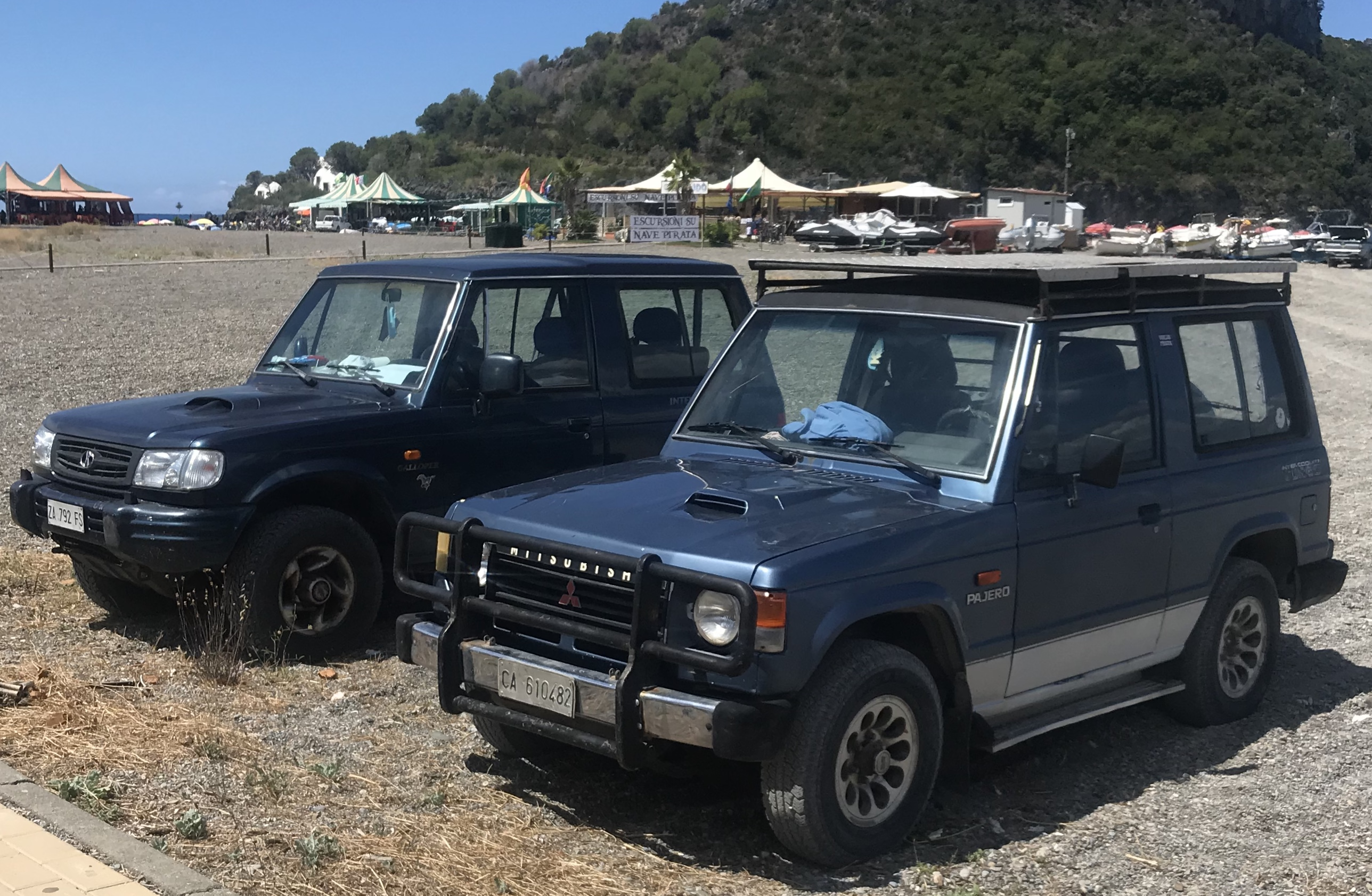
Galloper II (left) and first-generation Mitsubishi Pajero (right); the vehicles are largely identical, mechanically

The initial design is almost identical to the Mitsubishi Pajero; the main changes for the Korean market included steel brush/bumper guards on the higher-grade Exceed trim, running boards, and "Western"-style door-mounted side mirrors. The Galloper is a five-passenger vehicle with additional seating for two using a third row, increasing its capacity to a full seven passenger vehicle. It was available with a 3-door body on a short wheelbase for the Galloper 4WD and Galloper Innovation 4WD models or 5-door body on long wheelbase for the Galloper I/II Exceed models.

== First generation (1991–1997) ==
Galloper (I), 1991–1997

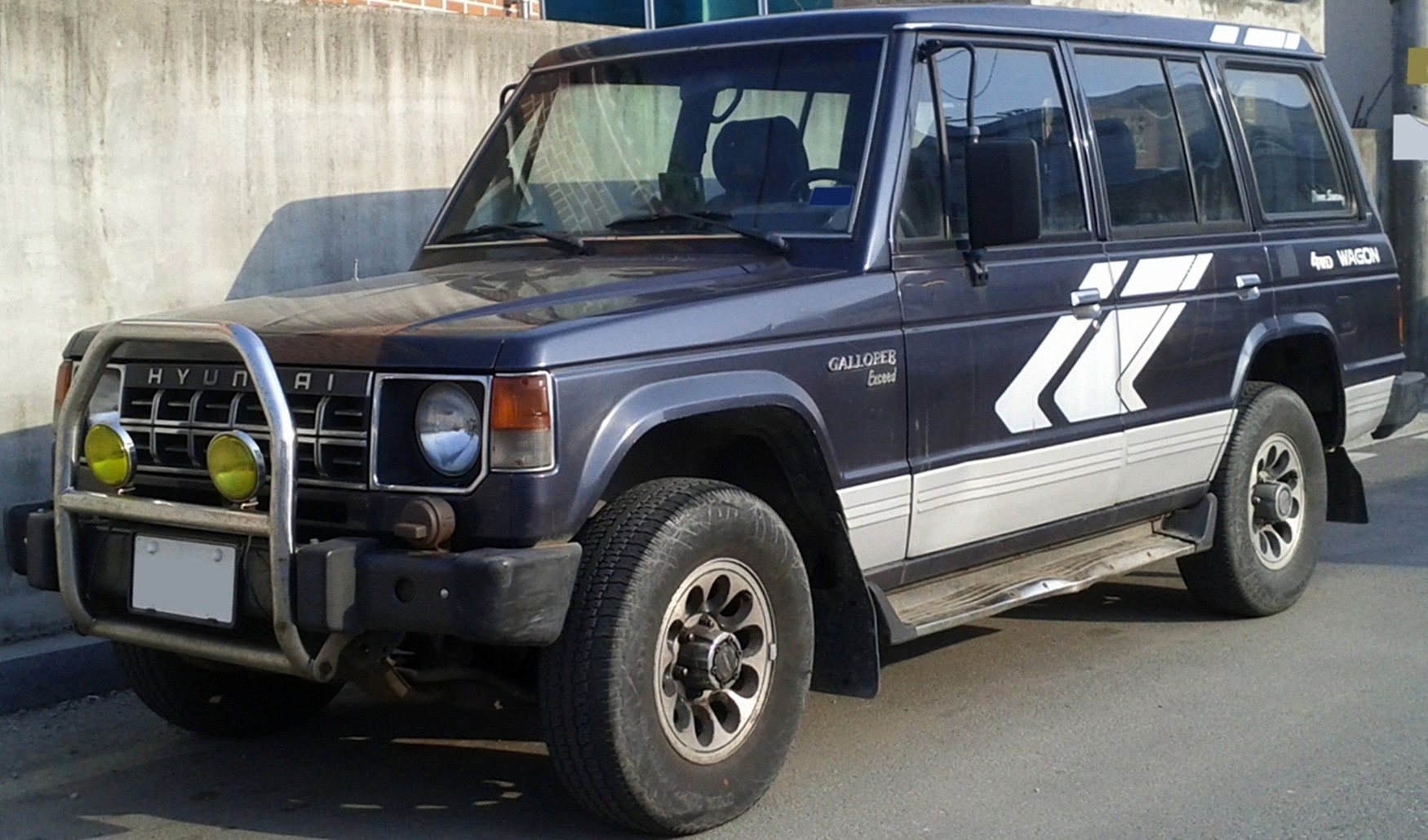
1991–1994

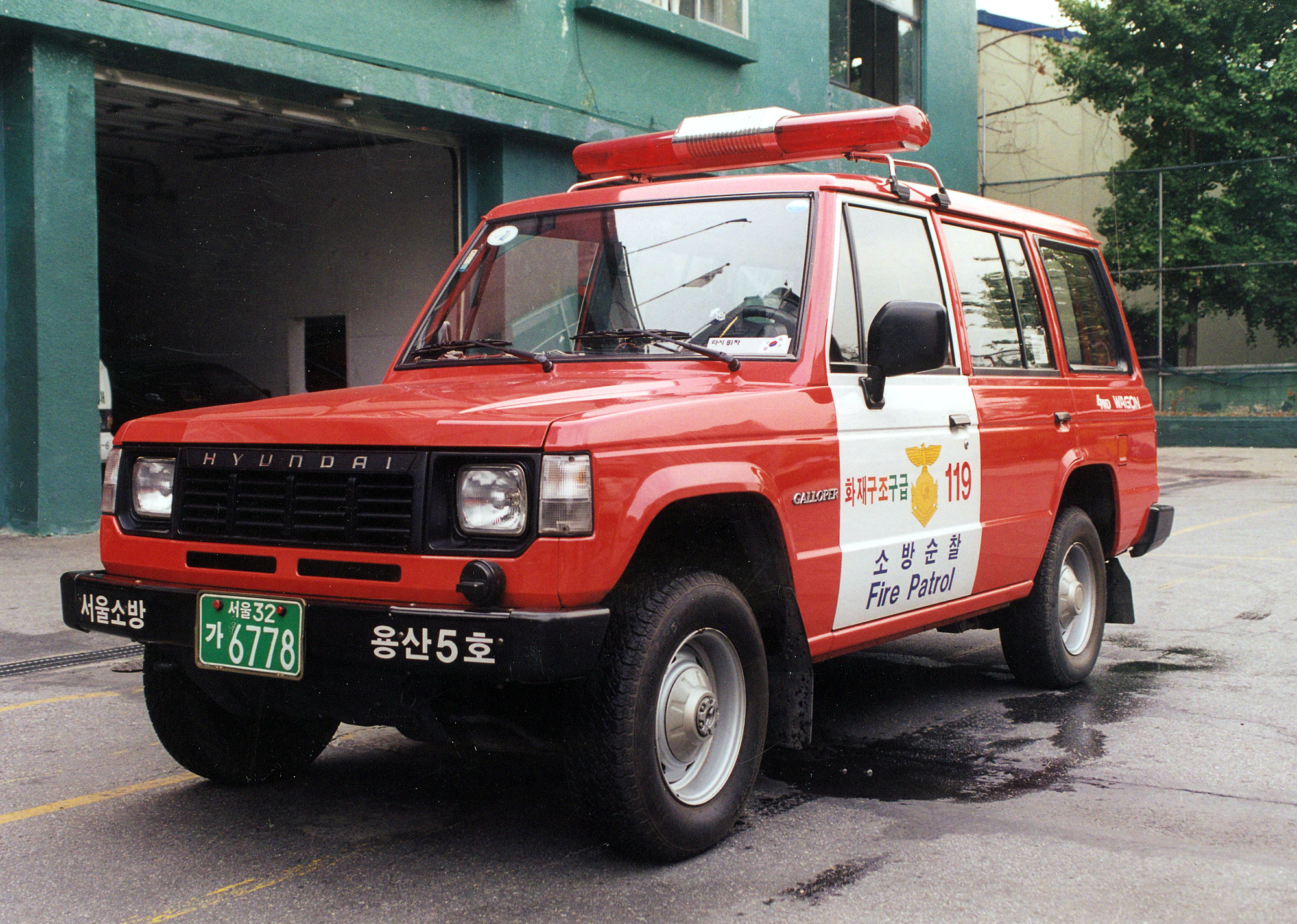
1994–1997, restyled

A launch event was held for the Galloper at the Seoul Hyatt Hotel on September 25, 1991. Within one year, it was the best-selling SUV in Korea. In February 1992, Hyundai Precision celebrated the assembly of its 5,000th Galloper. For the complete year, Hyundai sold 24,000 Gallopers in 1992, capturing 52% of the domestic market, unseating the Ssangyong Korando as the best-selling SUV in Korea; Ssangyong would respond by releasing the Musso in 1993 using engines from Mercedes-Benz. As part of the vehicle's advertising campaign, using the slogan "Follow the Sun to the West" (해를 따라 서쪽으로), three Gallopers were driven 73,000 km (45,000 mi) from March 28, 1992, to January 9, 1993, starting in Mumbai, India and traveling through 35 countries to Cabo da Roca, Portugal. Hyundai called it the "Travels of Marco Polo" (동방견문록) route. A book was published in 2000 detailing the journey.

When first released, the Galloper had round sealed-beam headlights. The vehicle launched as either Standard (5-seat, short wheelbase) or Exceed (6-seat, long wheelbase) models powered by a 2.5L naturally-aspirated 4-cylinder D4BA diesel engine with a peak output of 73 hp (54 kW) at 4200 rpm and 14.9 kg⋅m (108 lb⋅ft) at 2500 rpm, delivered through a 5-speed manual transmission; an automatic transmission was available from November, and a D4BF turbodiesel with improved power to 81 hp (60 kW) was made available in December. A G6AT 3.0L V6 gasoline engine option was added in February 1992. An intercooler was added to the turbodiesel in 1993, which was redesignated D4BH, boosting output to 101 hp (75 kW).

The suspension uses a double wishbone setup and torsion bar in the front, and a live axle with asymmetric leaf springs in the rear. Brakes are ventilated discs (front) and drums (rear) with a load-sensing valve to apportion braking force and resist rear-wheel lockup when lightly loaded.

When the second-generation Pajero was introduced in 1991, the production lines for the first generation were transferred to Hyundai Precision, which began assembling the Galloper in September 1991. Initially, the Galloper was assembled at the Hyundai Precision Industry, Co. Ltd. factory in the City of Ulsan's Buk-gu, Yeompo-dong neighborhood. Hyundai Motor Company produced the engines, transmission, and body panels for the Galloper, and Hyundai Motor Service distributed and sold the completed SUVs.

The vehicle was given a mild restyling in 1994, which can be distinguished from the original by the revised version's square headlights and horizontal side mirrors. In addition, new body styles and engine options were added, including one providing nine seats, enhancing the vehicle's use as a passenger vehicle. The revised model also went on a long journey to advertise the vehicle's capabilities; one of these was kept by Hyundai and is displayed at the Hyundai Kia R&D Museum.

In 1994, Hyundai began exporting the Galloper to other countries in Asia, starting with China. By December 1994, Hyundai had produced its 100,000th Galloper. Starting in 1997, the Galloper was introduced to most European markets as a left-hand drive-only vehicle, after approximately 220,000 Gallopers had been built. Production capacity was 60,000 vehicles per year.

== Second generation (1997–2004) ==
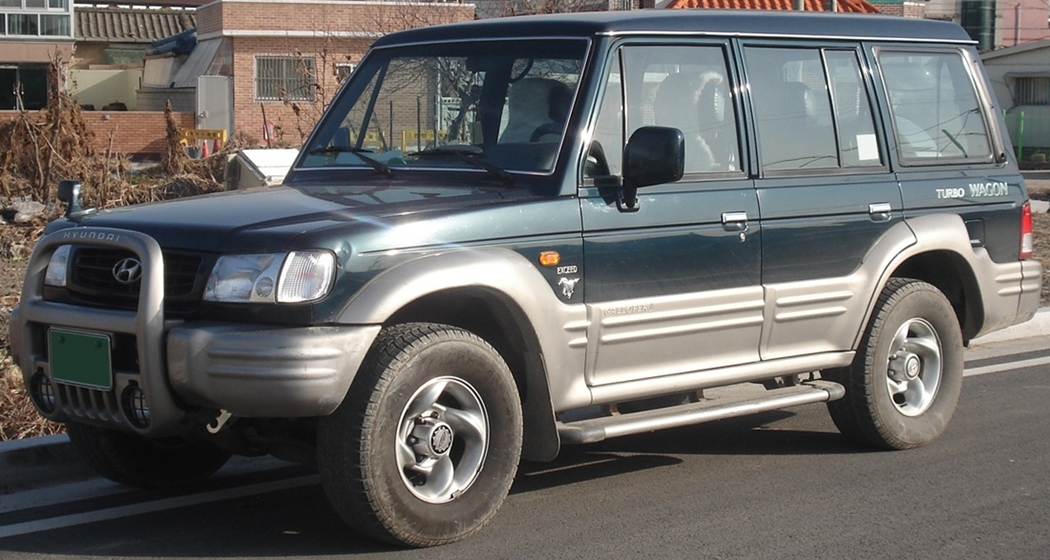
Galloper II

The Galloper II was released in 1997 with composite replaceable-bulb headlights; many models also received additional side cladding to emphasize the vehicle's rugged nature. Mechanically, the Galloper II was similar to the preceding generation; the updated styling made the Galloper II resemble the second-generation Pajero.

By 1999, Hyundai had produced more than 300,000 Gallopers. On July 31, 1999, the plant and production line were transferred from Hyundai Precision to Hyundai Motor Company, who renamed the plant to Hyundai Motors Ulsan Factory #5. Hyundai Precision was refocused as an automotive parts supplier. The Galloper was discontinued in January 2004 after a thirteen-year production run, succeeded by the Terracan.

== Galloper EV ==
In November 2021, Hyundai announced that the third model in their "Heritage Series" of restomod vehicles converted to a battery electric powertrain was to be based on the 1991 Galloper. As of 2025, however, the concept had not yet been revealed and is likely cancelled. It would have followed the Pony EV (April 2021) and Grandeur EV (November 2021).

== Reception ==
In an October 1991 review, Cartech was generally positive, noting its refinement compared to contemporary SUVs on the Korean Market. Criticism was limited to the short length of the gear selector, the lack of space between the driver and their door, and the difficult access for third-row passengers.

The Galloper was very successful in Europe, particularly in countries which had erected trade barriers against Japanese vehicles, such as Spain and Italy. The Galloper brand was brought back in 2026 for rebadged, Chinese-made Dongfeng Nissan products like the Paladin (Nissan Terra) and the Dongfeng Rich 6.

== Gallery ==
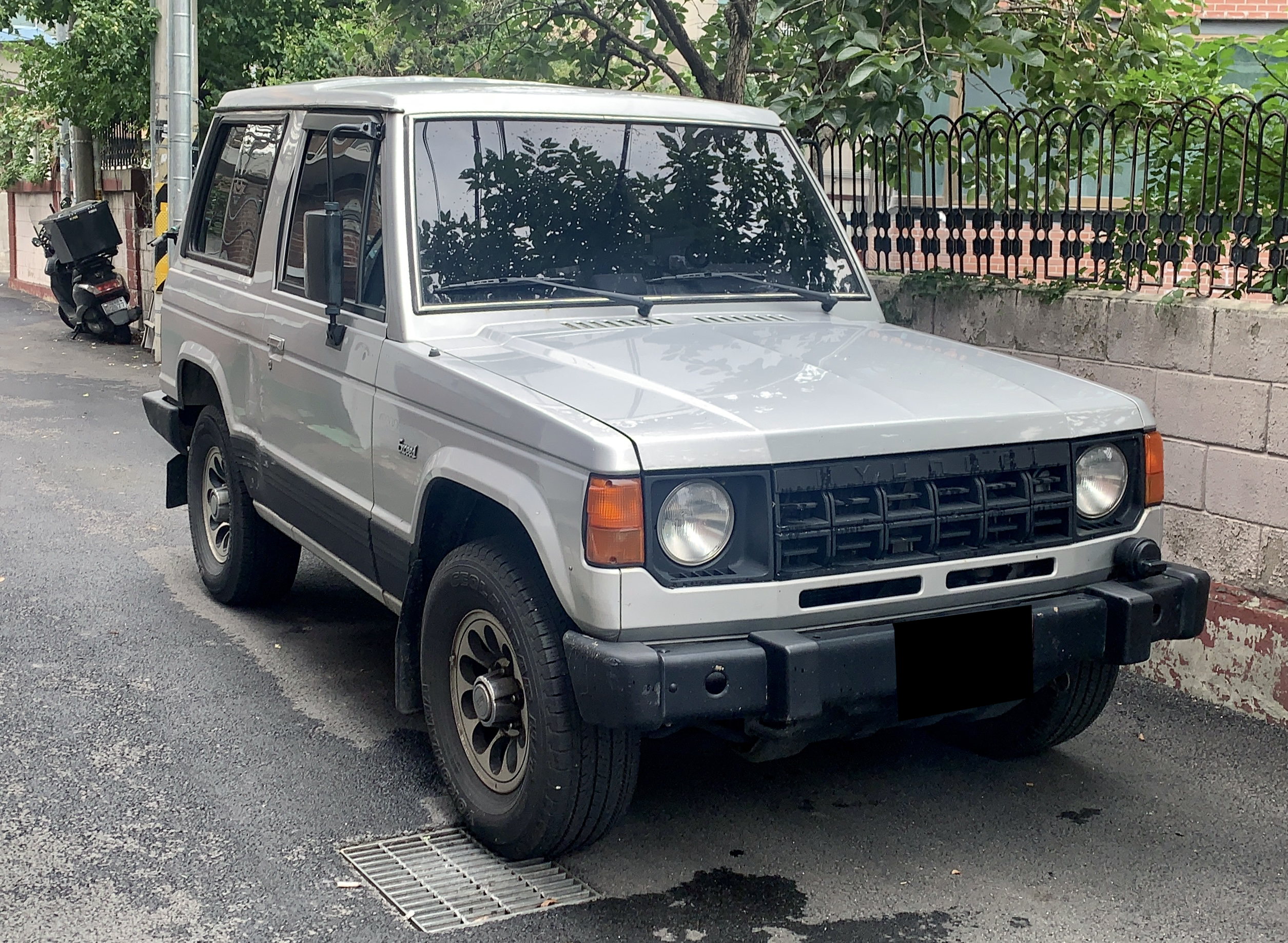
2-door Galloper I (pre-facelift)

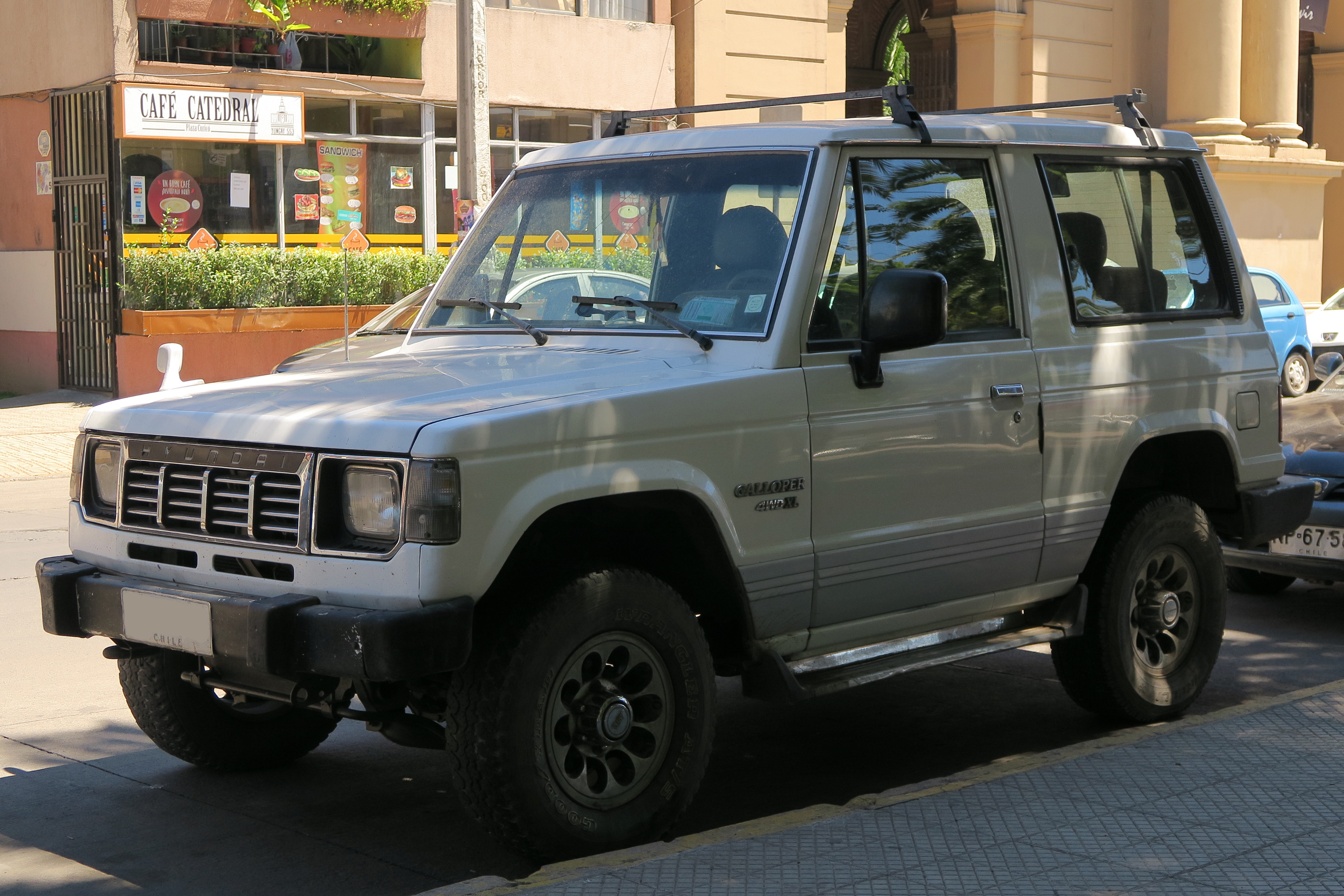
2-door Galloper I (post-facelift)

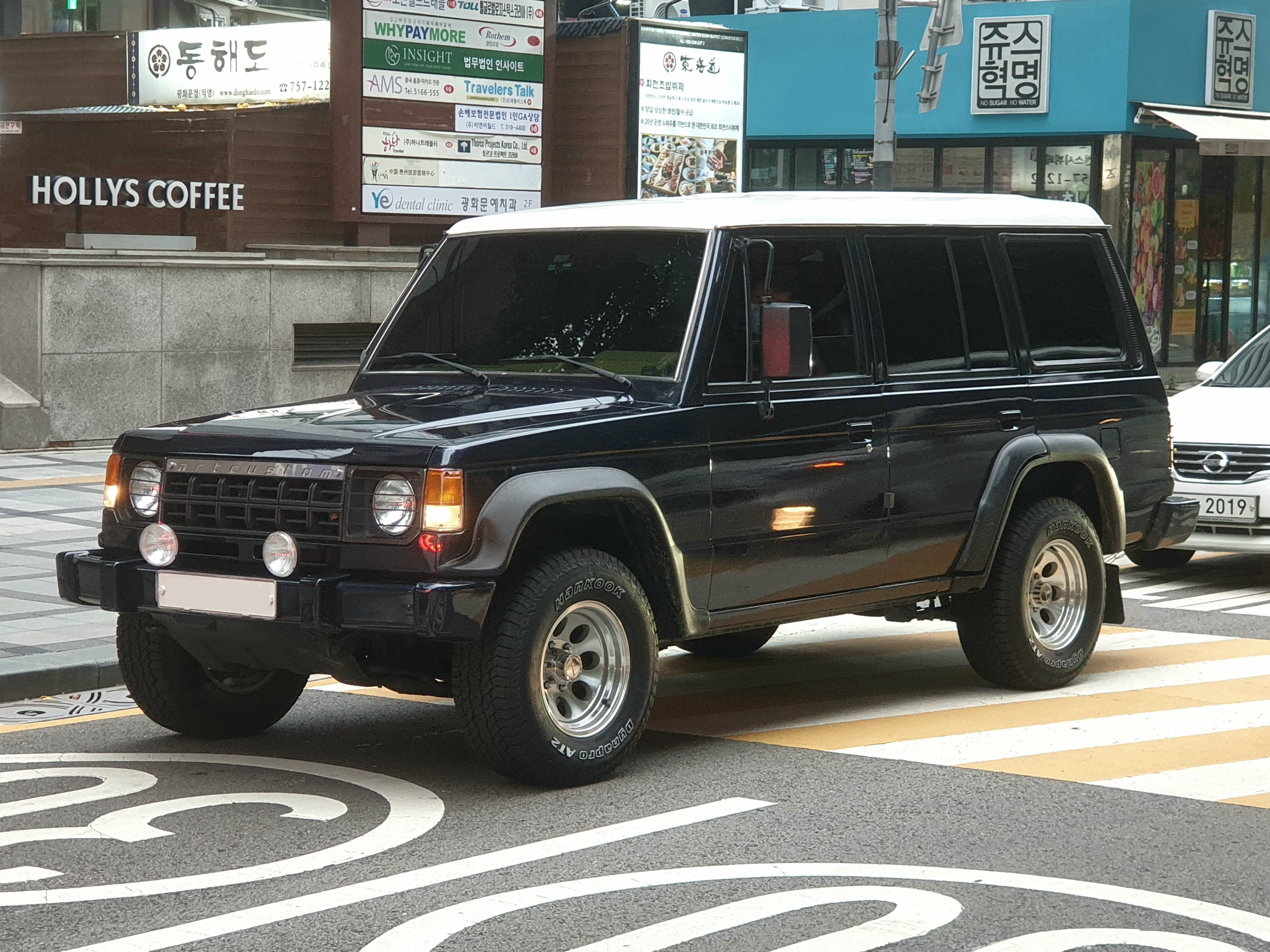
4-door Galloper I (pre-facelift, restored)

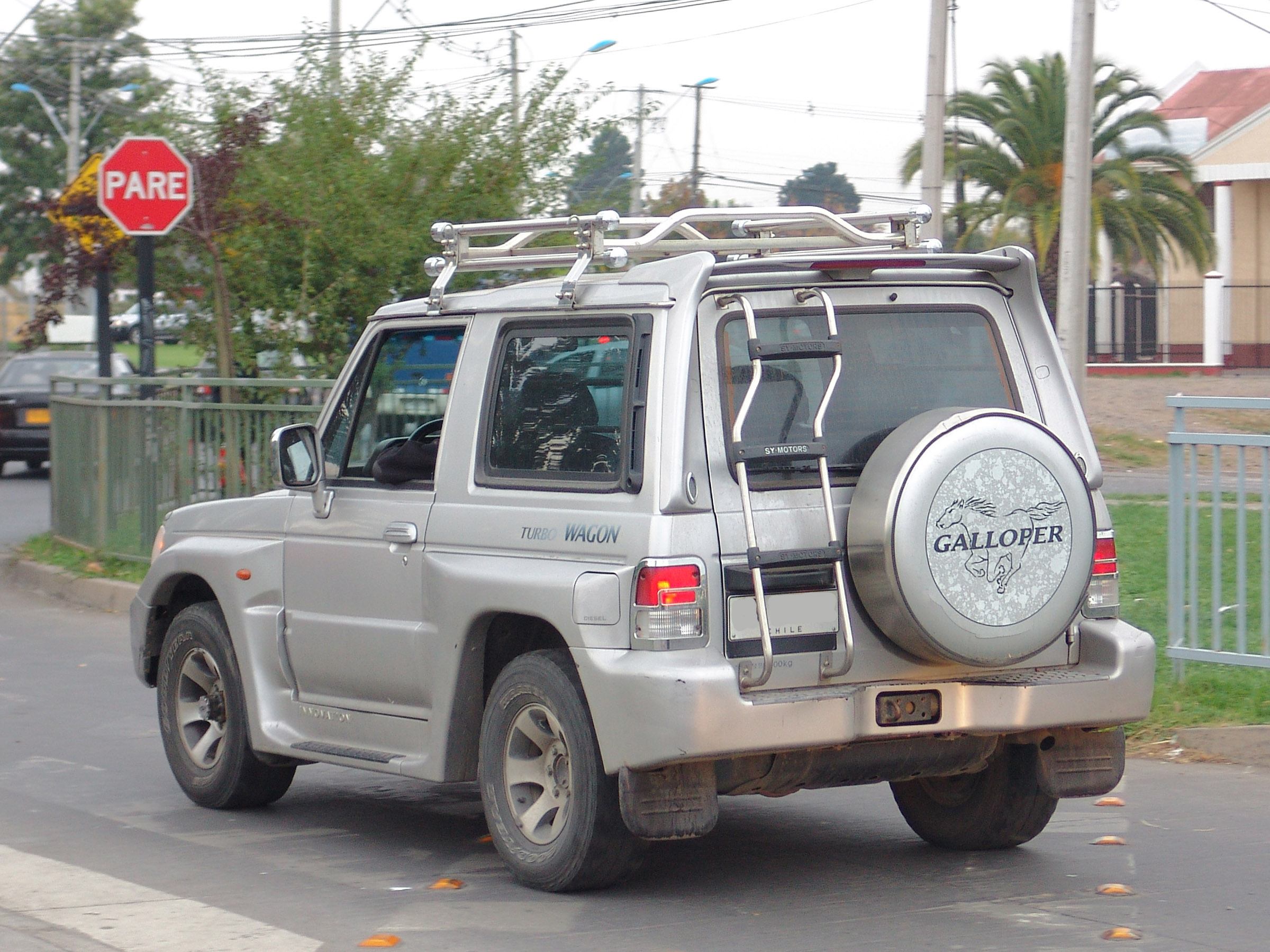
2000 2-door Galloper II Innovation Wagon

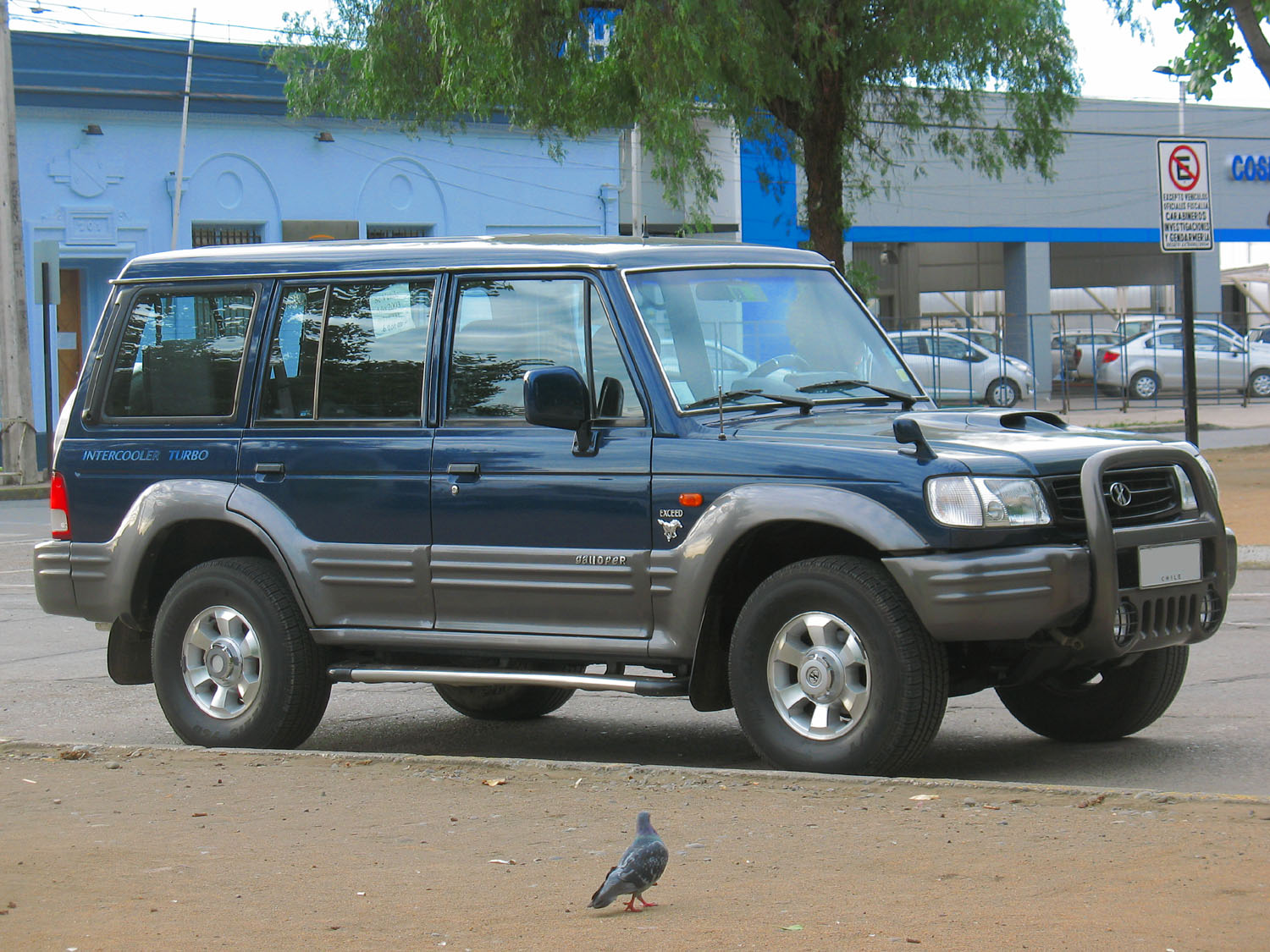
A 2003 Galloper II Exceed 2.5 TDI 4WD

== In media ==
- The Korean group Sultan of the Disco included a song entitled "Galloper" on their second studio album Aliens, which was released in 2018. The music video features clips from vintage Galloper advertisements and the "Marco Polo" expedition.

== See also ==
- Mitsubishi Pajero
