= Hyundai Kia R&D Museum =

The Hyundai Kia R&D Museum was opened in 2007 (19 years ago). It is located in Hyundai Kia R&D center, Hwaseong Gyeonggi, South Korea. It displays significant cars from Hyundai Motors and Kia Motors. It has 20 cars on display, and 190 cars in storage due to storage considerations. It displays some remarkable cars such as Hyundai Pony, Hyundai Stellar, Kia Bongo, Kia Sephia, Kia Elan, Hyundai Porter and Hyundai Accent. Hyundai Motors is still looking for its previous models, such as Ford Cortina, which was Hyundai's first production car. Hyundai is planning to make Hyundai Motor Museum which is scheduled to open in 2016. The museum will be constructed by Hyundai Construction.

== Visiting ==
To visit the museum, one must be invited by Hyundai Motor Group or be an employee who works for the group. Visits are limited to small groups, and, because the museum is located at the R&D center, there are limitations on photography.

== Other museums ==
Hyundai and Kia Motors also own the other museum. It is located in the factory complex for visitors to take a look at the history of the company. The rest of the South Korean Motor companies like GM Korea and SsangYong Motor Company does not collect or have their museums. The "R&D Museum" is one of the two automaker-owned museums in South Korea; the other being the Renault Samsung Motors Gallery, which was established in 1998.
