= Hyundai Sigma engine =

Σ engine^{Sigma engine}

Overview
- Manufacturer: Hyundai Motor Company
- Production: 1989–2007

Layout
- Configuration: V6
- Displacement: 2.5 L; 152.4 cu in (2,497 cc); 3.0 L; 181.4 cu in (2,972 cc); 3.5 L; 213.4 cu in (3,497 cc)
- Cylinder bore: 83.5 mm (3.29 in); 91.1 mm (3.59 in); 93 mm (3.66 in)
- Piston stroke: 76 mm (2.99 in); 85.8 mm (3.38 in)
- Cylinder block material: Cast iron
- Cylinder head material: Aluminum
- Valvetrain: SOHC, DOHC 4 valves x cyl.

Combustion
- Fuel system: Multi-port fuel injection
- Fuel type: Gasoline; LPG
- Cooling system: Water-cooled

Output
- Power output: 135–220 PS (99–162 kW; 133–217 hp)
- Torque output: 20.8–32 kg⋅m (204–314 N⋅m; 150–231 lbf⋅ft)

Chronology
- Successor: Hyundai Lambda engine

The Hyundai Sigma engine is what Hyundai Motor Company called the Mitsubishi 6G7 engine when manufactured in South Korea. It is a series of V6 piston engines. The Sigma engine family began life with the simple V6 name. Displacement ranges from 2.5 to 3.5 L (2,497 to 3,497 cc).

== 2.5L (G6AV) ==
The DOHC G6AV (also called the 2.5 D, "D" for DOHC) is the small 2,497 cc (2.5 L; 152.4 cu in) version. Bore is 83.5 mm (3.29 in) and stroke is shared with the 3.0 L (2,972 cc) at 76 mm (2.99 in). Output is 162–173 PS (119–127 kW; 160–171 hp) at 6,000 rpm and 20.8–22.4 kg⋅m (204–220 N⋅m; 150–162 lbf⋅ft) at 4,500 rpm.

=== Applications ===
- Hyundai Dynasty (1997–2005)
- Hyundai Grandeur (LX) (1995–1998)
- Hyundai Marcia (1995–1998)

== 3.0L (G6AT/G6CT) ==
The DOHC G6AT and G6CT (also called the 3.0 D, "D" for DOHC) both displace 2,972 cc (3.0 L; 181.4 cu in). They share the 2.5's 76 mm (2.99 in) stroke but use a larger 91.1 mm (3.59 in) bore. Output for the older G6AT is 185–205 PS (136–151 kW; 182–202 hp) at 6,000 rpm and 24.6–27.1 kg⋅m (241–266 N⋅m; 178–196 lbf⋅ft) at 4,000–4,500 rpm, while the G6CT produces 187–196 PS (138–144 kW; 184–193 hp) at 5,500–6,000 rpm and 26.5–27.2 kg⋅m (260–267 N⋅m; 192–197 lbf⋅ft) at 3,500–4,000 rpm.

The older SOHC G6AT 3.0 S produces just 141–164 PS (104–121 kW; 139–162 hp) at 5,000 rpm and 22.9–24.5 kg⋅m (225–240 N⋅m; 166–177 lbf⋅ft) at 2,500–3,000 rpm.

=== Applications ===
- Hyundai Dynasty (1996–2005)
- Hyundai Equus (LZ) (1999–2005)
- Hyundai Galloper (1994–2000)
- Hyundai Grandeur (1989–2005)
- Hyundai Sonata (Y3) (1990–1998)
- Hyundai Starex (A1) (1999–2003)
- Hyundai XG300 (2001)
- Kia Opirus (2003–2006)

== 3.0L LPG (L6AT) ==
The L6AT displace 2,972 cc (3.0 L; 181.4 cu in). They share the 2.5's 76 mm (2.99 in) stroke but use a larger 91.1 mm (3.59 in) bore. Output is 135 PS (99 kW; 133 hp) at 4,500 rpm and 23–24 kg⋅m (226–235 N⋅m; 166–174 lbf⋅ft) at 2,500 rpm.

=== Applications ===
- Hyundai Galloper (1998–2003)
- Hyundai Libero (2000–2007)
- Hyundai Starex (A1) (1999–2003)

== 3.5L (G6AU/G6CU) ==
The G6AU and G6CU (both also called the 3.5 D ) are the large 3,497 cc (3.5 L; 213.4 cu in) versions of the Sigma engine. Bore and stroke are both larger at 93 mm × 85.8 mm (3.66 in × 3.38 in), respectively. Output is 203–225 PS (149–165 kW; 200–222 hp) at 5,500 rpm and 29.6–31.8 kg⋅m (290–312 N⋅m; 214–230 lbf⋅ft) at 4,000 rpm for the older G6AU and 195–220 PS (143–162 kW; 192–217 hp) at 5,500–6,000 rpm and 30–32 kg⋅m (294–314 N⋅m; 217–231 lbf⋅ft) at 3,500 rpm for the newer G6CU.

The 3.5 D has a cast iron engine block and aluminum DOHC cylinder heads. It uses Multi-port fuel injection, has 4 valves per cylinder, and features forged steel connecting rods. It is designed to run on "regular" unleaded gasoline rather than the premium fuel used in many other high-output V6 engines.

The US-market version produces 197 PS (145 kW; 194 hp) at 5,500 rpm with 30.3 kg⋅m (297 N⋅m; 219 lbf⋅ft) of torque at 3,500 rpm. It was introduced with the Kia Sedona minivan in 2001.

=== Applications ===
- Hyundai Dynasty (1996–1999)
- Hyundai Equus (LZ) (1999–2005)
- Hyundai Grandeur (1994–1996, 2002–2005)
- Hyundai Santa Fe (SM) (2002–2005)
- Hyundai Terracan (2001–2007)
- Hyundai XG350 (XG) (2002–2005)
- Kia Opirus (2003–2006)
- Kia Sedona (GQ) (2001–2005)
- Kia Sorento (BL) (2003–2006)

== See also ==
- List of Hyundai engines
- Mitsubishi 6G7 engine
