= Hyundai Aslan =

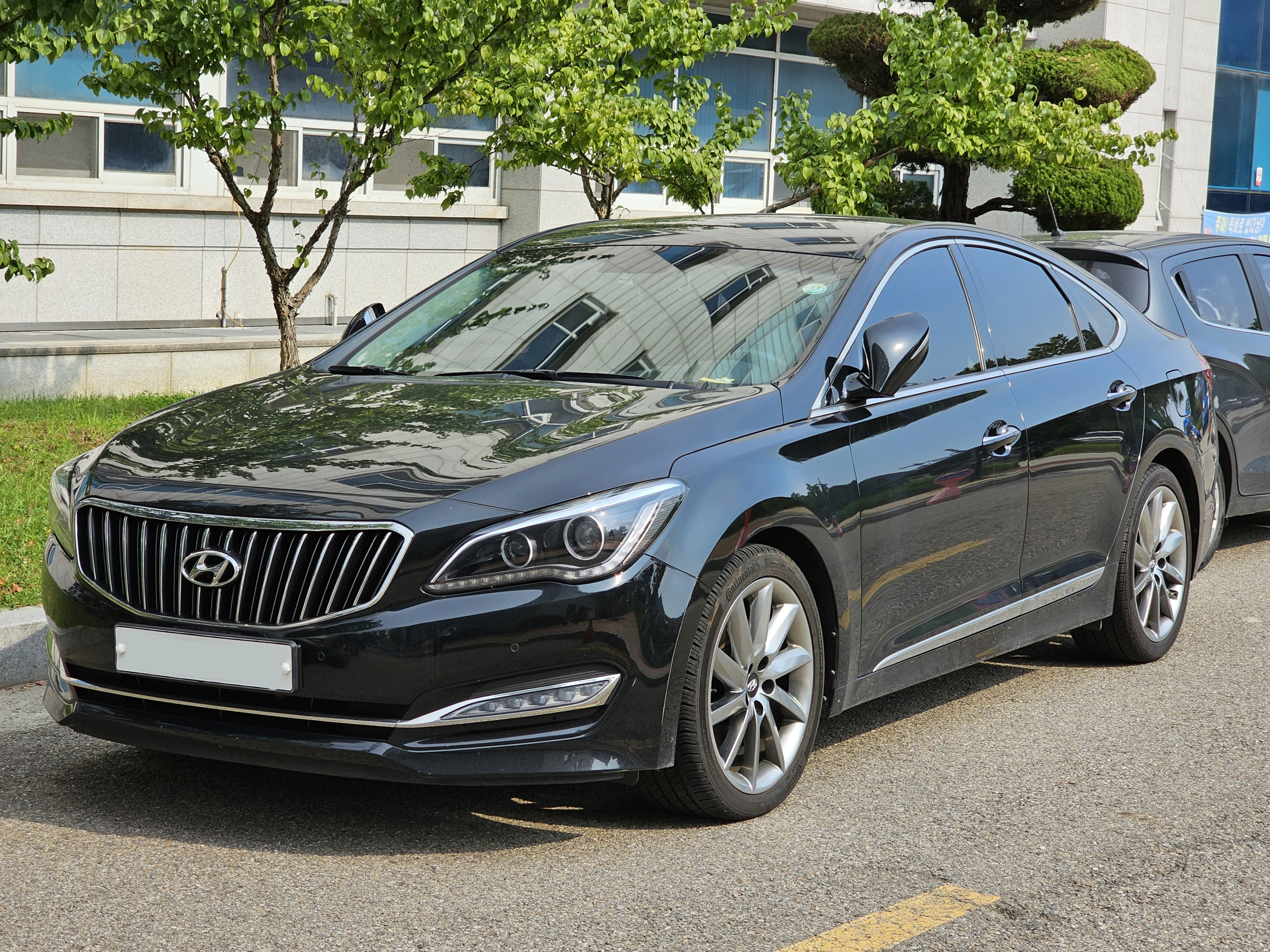

Overview
- Manufacturer: Hyundai
- Model code: AG
- Production: October 2014 – December 2017
- Assembly: South Korea: Asan (Hyundai Motor Company Asan Plant)

Body and chassis
- Class: Executive car (E)
- Body style: 4-door sedan
- Layout: Transverse Front-engine, front-wheel-drive
- Platform: Hyundai–Kia Y6 platform
- Related: Hyundai Grandeur (HG); Kia Cadenza

Powertrain
- Engine: Petrol: 3.0 L Lambda II GDI V6; 3.3 L Lambda II GDI V6
- Power output: 266–270 PS (196–199 kW; 262–266 hp) (3.0 L); 290–294 PS (213–216 kW; 286–290 hp) (3.3 L)
- Transmission: 6-speed automatic (2014–2016); 8-speed automatic (2017)

Dimensions
- Wheelbase: 2,845 mm (112.0 in)
- Length: 4,970 mm (195.7 in)
- Width: 1,860 mm (73.2 in)
- Height: 1,470 mm (57.9 in)
- Curb weight: 1,665–1,720 kg (3,671–3,792 lb)

Chronology
- Predecessor: Hyundai Dynasty

The Hyundai Aslan is an executive car manufactured and marketed by Hyundai from 2014–2017. Its exterior and interior design are similar to those of the rear-wheel-drive Genesis but it shares the front-wheel-drive Y6 platform with the Grandeur. In terms of size, it is situated between the Grandeur and Genesis replacing the market segment previously held by the Dynasty. The name "aslan" is Turkish for lion.

== Engines ==
Petrol engines
Model	Years	Type/code	Power	Torque
Lambda 3.0 GDi	2014–2017	2,999 cc (183.0 cu in) V6	266–270 PS (196–199 kW; 262–266 hp) @ 6,400 rpm	31.4–31.6 kg⋅m (308–310 N⋅m; 227–229 lbf⋅ft) @ 5,300 rpm
Lambda 3.3 GDi/G330	2014–2017	3,342 cc (203.9 cu in) V6	290–294 PS (213–216 kW; 286–290 hp) @ 6,400 rpm	35–35.3 kg⋅m (343–346 N⋅m; 253–255 lbf⋅ft) @ 5,200 rpm

== Transmissions ==
All models from 2014–2016 include a 6-speed automatic transmission with SHIFTRONIC manual shift mode. 2017 models include an 8-speed automatic transmission with SHIFTRONIC manual shift mode.

== Equipment ==
- Rear Cross-Traffic Alert
- Blind Spot Detection
- LDWS Lane Departure Warning with Lane Keep Assist
- FCWS Forward collision warning system
- ASCC Advanced Smart Cruise Control Stop & Go
- Automotive head-up display
- Human–machine interface
- AFLS Advanced Front-Lighting System HID Headlights with High Beam Assist
- Tire Pressure Monitoring with Individual Tire Indicator
- Intelligent Drive Mode monitors and modifies engine throttle response, transmission shift points, steering and suspension.
- Continuous Damping Control
- ASPAS Advanced Smart Parking Assist System
- AVM Around View Monitor
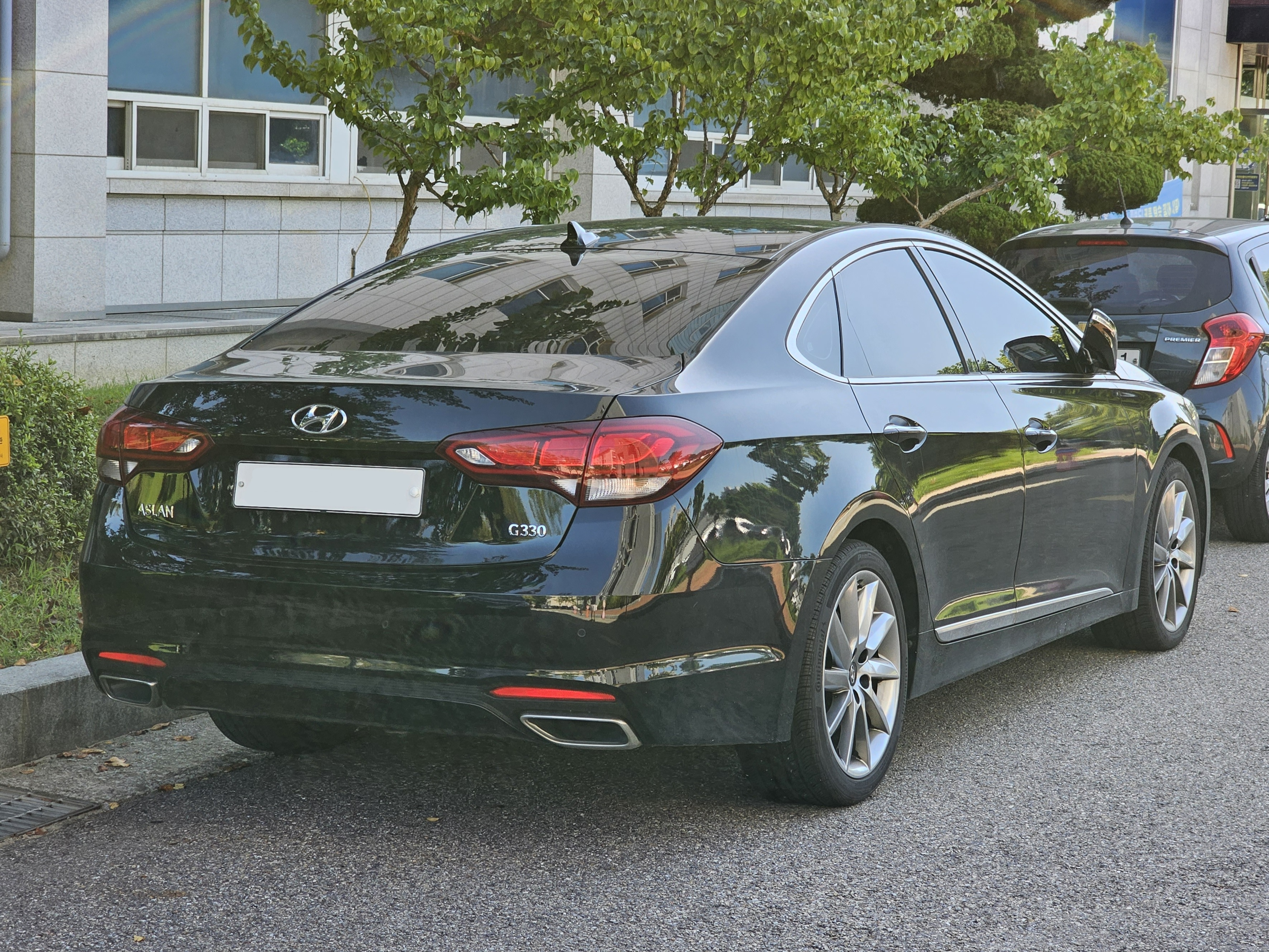
Rear view
