= Hyundai Dynasty =

Premium executive sedan

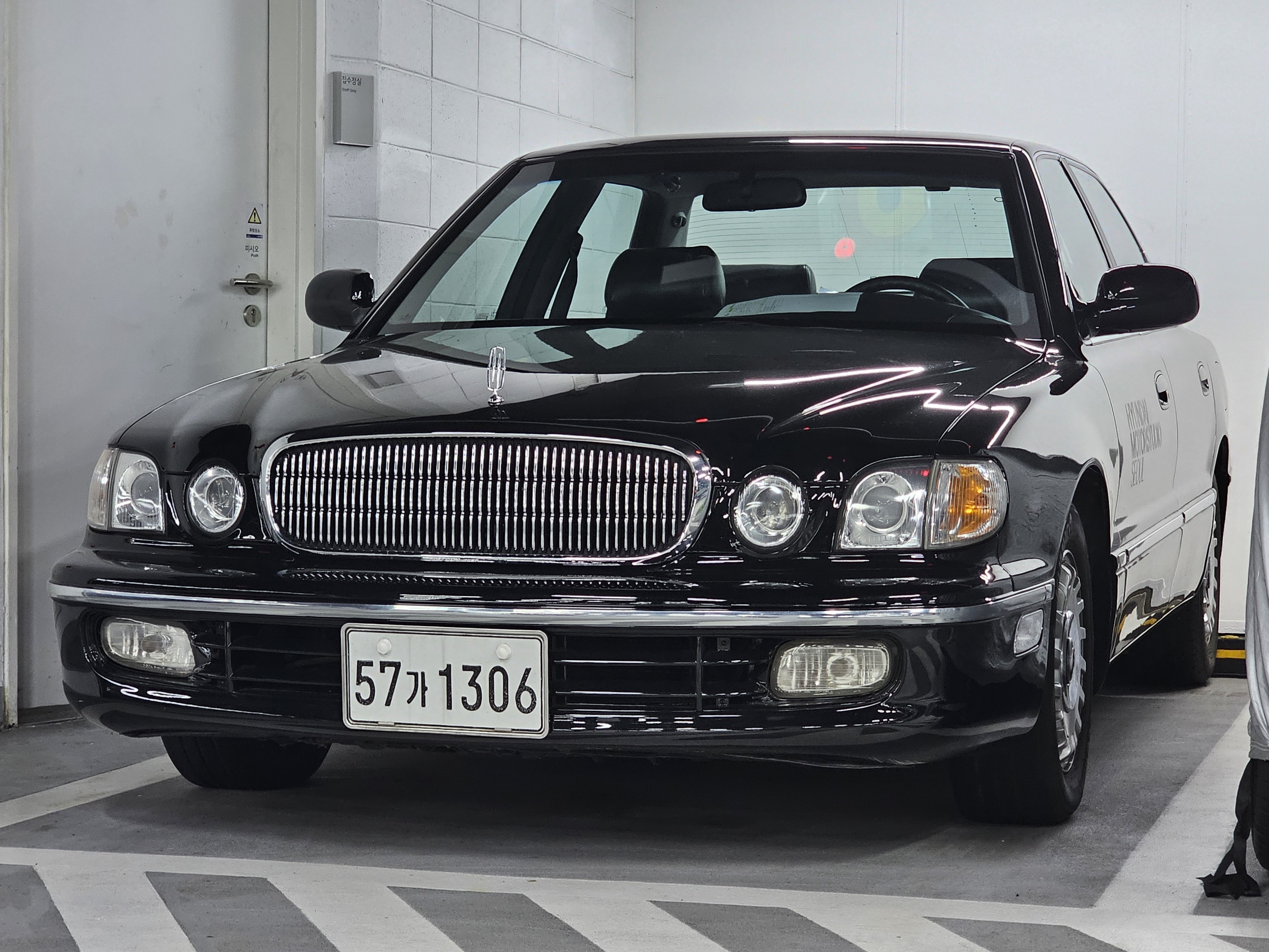
- Hyundai Dynasty right side

Overview
- Manufacturer: Hyundai
- Model code: LX
- Production: 1996–2005; 1997–2002 (LWB)
- Assembly: Ulsan, South Korea

Body and chassis
- Class: Executive car (E)
- Body style: 4-door sedan
- Layout: Transverse Front-engine, front-wheel-drive
- Platform: Hyundai Y3
- Related: Hyundai Grandeur

Powertrain
- Engine: 2.5 L ΣSigma V6; 3.0 L ΣSigma V6; 3.5 L ΣSigma V6
- Transmission: 5-speed manual 4-speed automatic

Dimensions
- Wheelbase: 2,745 mm (108.1 in); 2,900 mm (114.2 in) (LWB)
- Length: 4,980 mm (196.1 in); 5,135 mm (202.2 in) (LWB)
- Width: 1,810 mm (71.3 in)
- Height: 1,445 mm (56.9 in)
- Curb weight: 1,651–1,713 kg (3,640–3,777 lb)

Chronology
- Successor: Hyundai Aslan

The Hyundai Dynasty is a premium executive sedan that debuted in 1996. Manufactured by Hyundai Motor Company, features of the Dynasty included electronically controlled suspension, dual climate control, and power memory seats (front and rear). To differentiate the Dynasty from its shared platform smaller Grandeur, Hyundai used a different badge (stylized D logo) for Dynasty.

== Overview ==
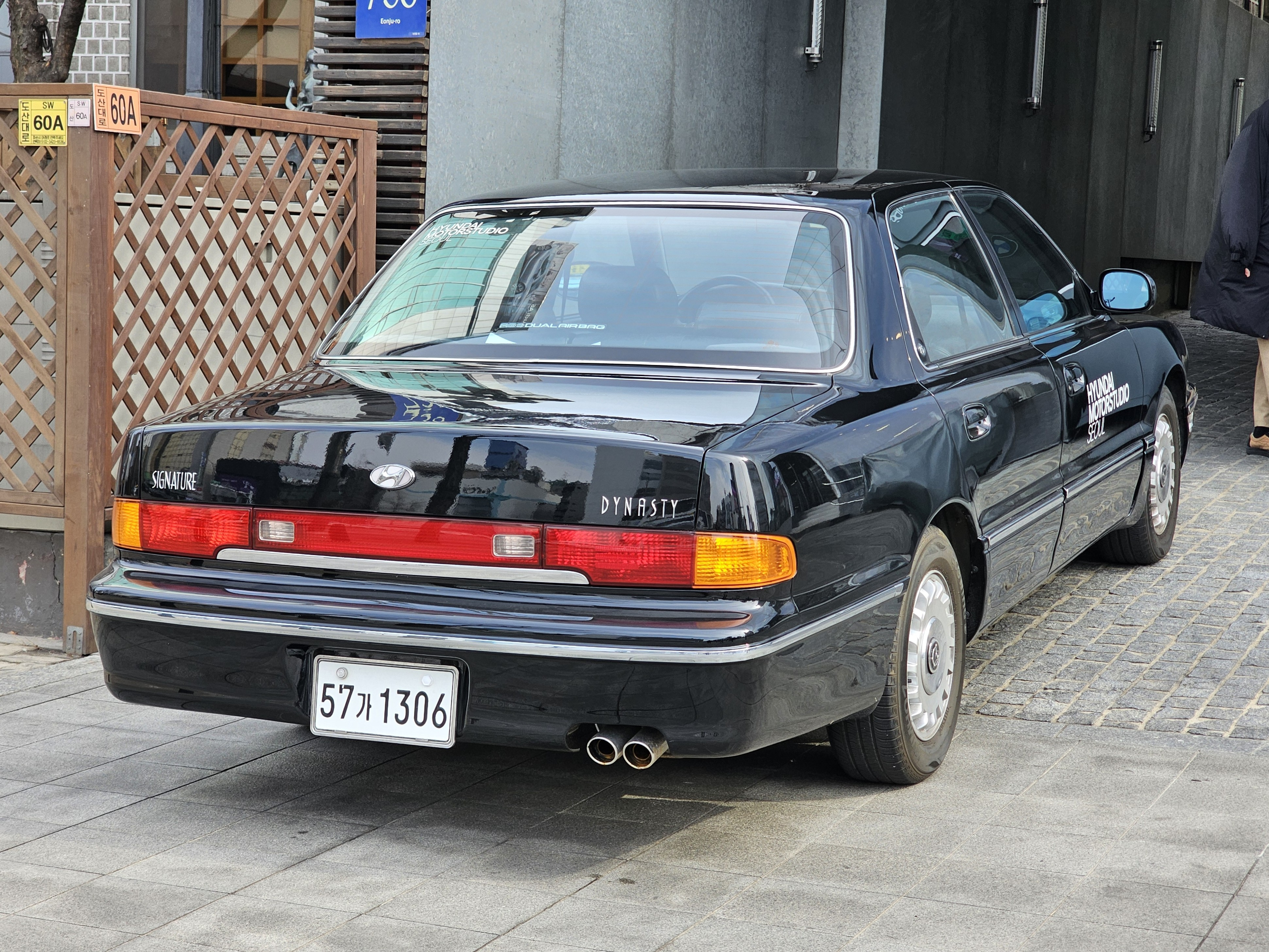
Rear View

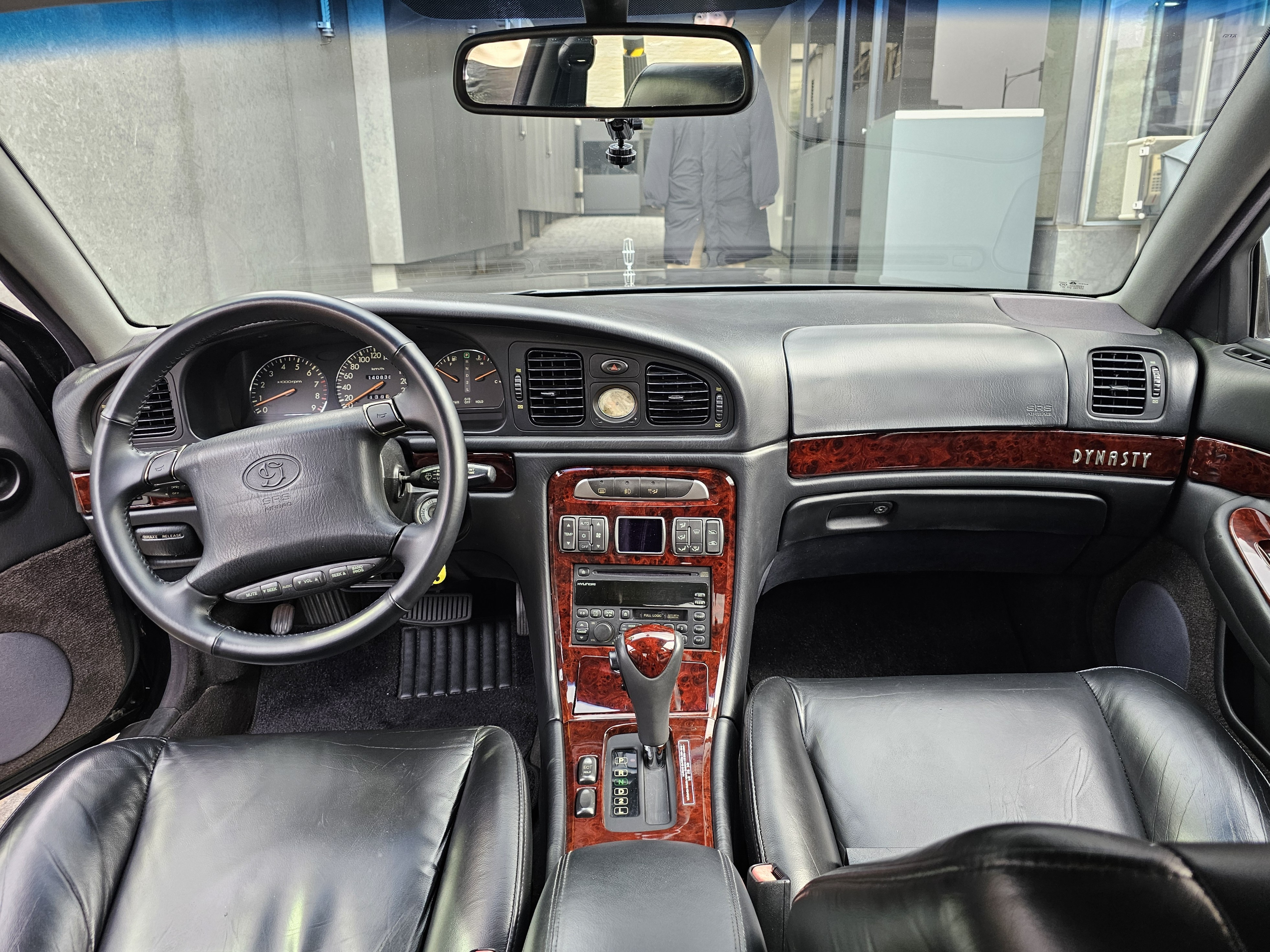
Interior

The Dynasty was produced in Ulsan, South Korea and it was discontinued in 2005. The Dynasty was the top level flagship at its introduction, but it was a front wheel drive vehicle. It featured higher level of luxury equipment and was available in extended length versions to differentiate it from the Grandeur models. The 2.5-litre V6 engine produces 167 PS (123 kW) at 6000 rpm, while the larger 3 and 3.5-liter engines offered 205 and 225 PS (151 and 165 kW) at 6000 and 5500 rpm respectively. The claimed outputs later dropped to 162, 194 and 210 PS (119, 143 and 154 kW), and the 3-liter engine eventually dropped to 185 PS (136 kW).

When the joint luxury flagship Mitsubishi Proudia/Hyundai Equus was introduced in April 1999, the flagship designation was removed from the Dynasty and sales suffered. The 3.5-litre engine was discontinued at this time.

With the introduction of a separate marketing channel for the rear-drive Genesis Motors, the market segment position formally filled by the front-wheel drive Dynasty was replaced by the Hyundai Aslan.
