= Renault Korea Gallery =

Renault Korea Gallery 르노코리아 갤러리
- Established: June 2001; 25 years ago
- Location: Busan, South Korea
- Coordinates: 35.094°N 128.881°E
- Type: Automotive museum
- Visitors: 27,285 (2009)

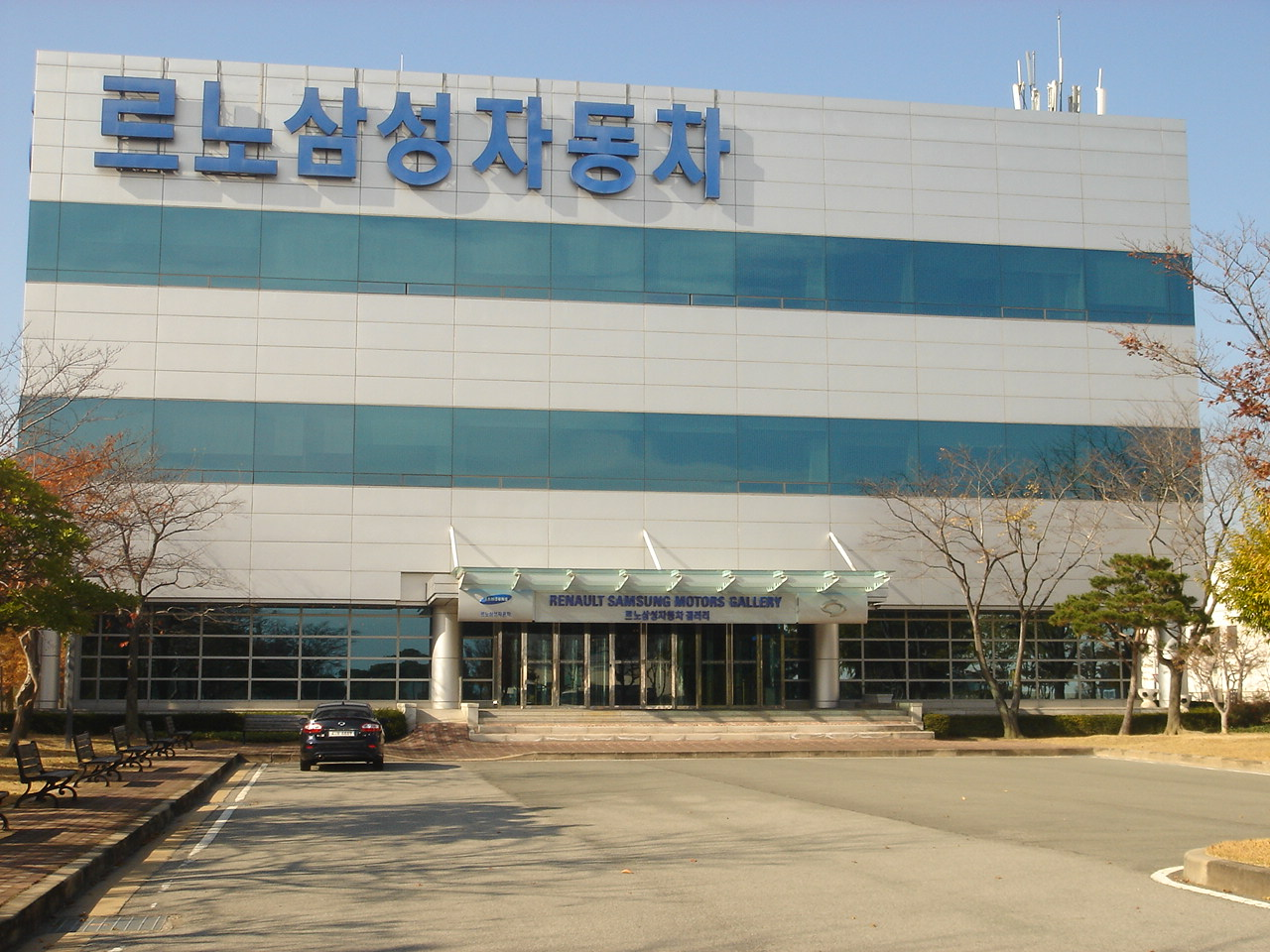
Old Renault Samsung Gallery front

Renault Korea Gallery (Korean: 르노코리아 갤러리) is a museum owned by the Korean Vehicle Manufacturer Renault Korea.

The museum was opened as the Reuno Samseong Munhwagwan (르노삼성 문화관) or Renault Samsung Culture Center in June 2001. It was renovated in September 2006, adopting its current name. For its tenth anniversary were made further improvements.

The facilities feature SM7 / QM5 cutaway models to display, cutaway engines (M9R diesel, VQ, etc.), previous and special models (SM5, SM3, Seoul Motor Show exhibition cars, etc.) and diagrams of production process. The museum also displays various projects of the Renault-Nissan Alliance.

There are several road safety programs targeted at children. The museum has a page where can be made virtual tours through the factory. There also are guided factory tours which must be reserved.
