= Hyundai Tucson =

Compact crossover SUV

- Fourth generation Tucson (NX4)

Overview
- Manufacturer: Hyundai
- Also called: Hyundai ix35 (2009–2015)
- Production: 2004–present
- Model years: 2005–present

Body and chassis
- Class: Compact crossover SUV (C)
- Body style: 5-door SUV
- Layout: Front engine, front-wheel-drive Front engine, all-wheel-drive

The Hyundai Tucson (/ˈtuːsɒn/; Korean: 현대 투싼) is a compact crossover SUV produced by the South Korean manufacturer Hyundai. It is named after the city of Tucson, Arizona, U.S.

The second-generation model was marketed as the Hyundai ix35 in several markets, including Europe, Australia and China, before reverting to Tucson for the third-generation. Since its first-generation, the Tucson has been developed alongside the Kia Sportage, sharing platforms and engines.

The Tucson is the best-selling Hyundai model, with more than 7 million units sold globally since it launched in 2004. Of these, 1.4 million units have been sold in Europe.

== First generation (JM; 2004) ==
First generation
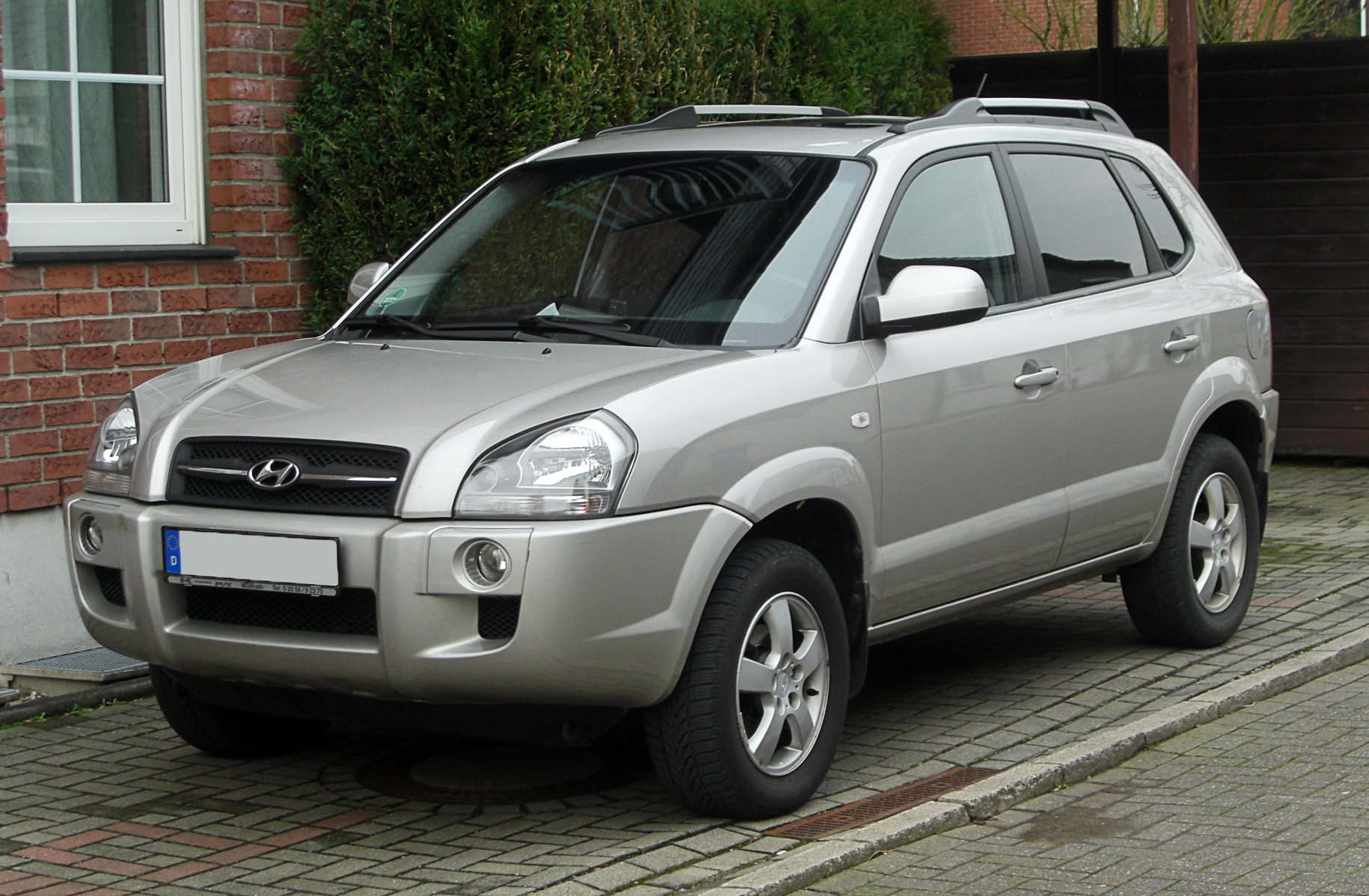
- Hyundai Tucson (Germany; pre-facelift)

Overview
- Model code: JM
- Also called: Hyundai JM (Japan)
- Production: 2004–2009; 2005–2019 (Brazil); 2005–2010 (Taiwan); 2007–2010 (Ukraine)
- Model years: 2005–2009
- Assembly: South Korea: Ulsan; China: Beijing (Beijing Hyundai); India: Chennai (Hyundai India); Brazil: Anápolis (Hyundai Caoa); Egypt: Cairo (Ghabbour Group); Ukraine: Cherkasy (Bogdan); Taiwan: Hukou, Hsinchu (SYM Motors)

Body and chassis
- Related: Kia Sportage (JE/KM); Hyundai Elantra (XD)

Powertrain
- Engine: Petrol: 2.0 L Beta II DOHC CVVT I4; 2.7 L Delta DOHC CVVT V6; Diesel: 2.0 L D CRDi-VGT I4
- Transmission: 5-speed manual; 6-speed manual; 4-speed automatic; 5-speed automatic

Dimensions
- Wheelbase: 2,630 mm (103.5 in)
- Length: 4,325 mm (170.3 in)
- Width: 1,795 mm (70.7 in)
- Height: 1,730 mm (68.1 in)
- Curb weight: 1,470–1,529 kg (3,241–3,371 lb)

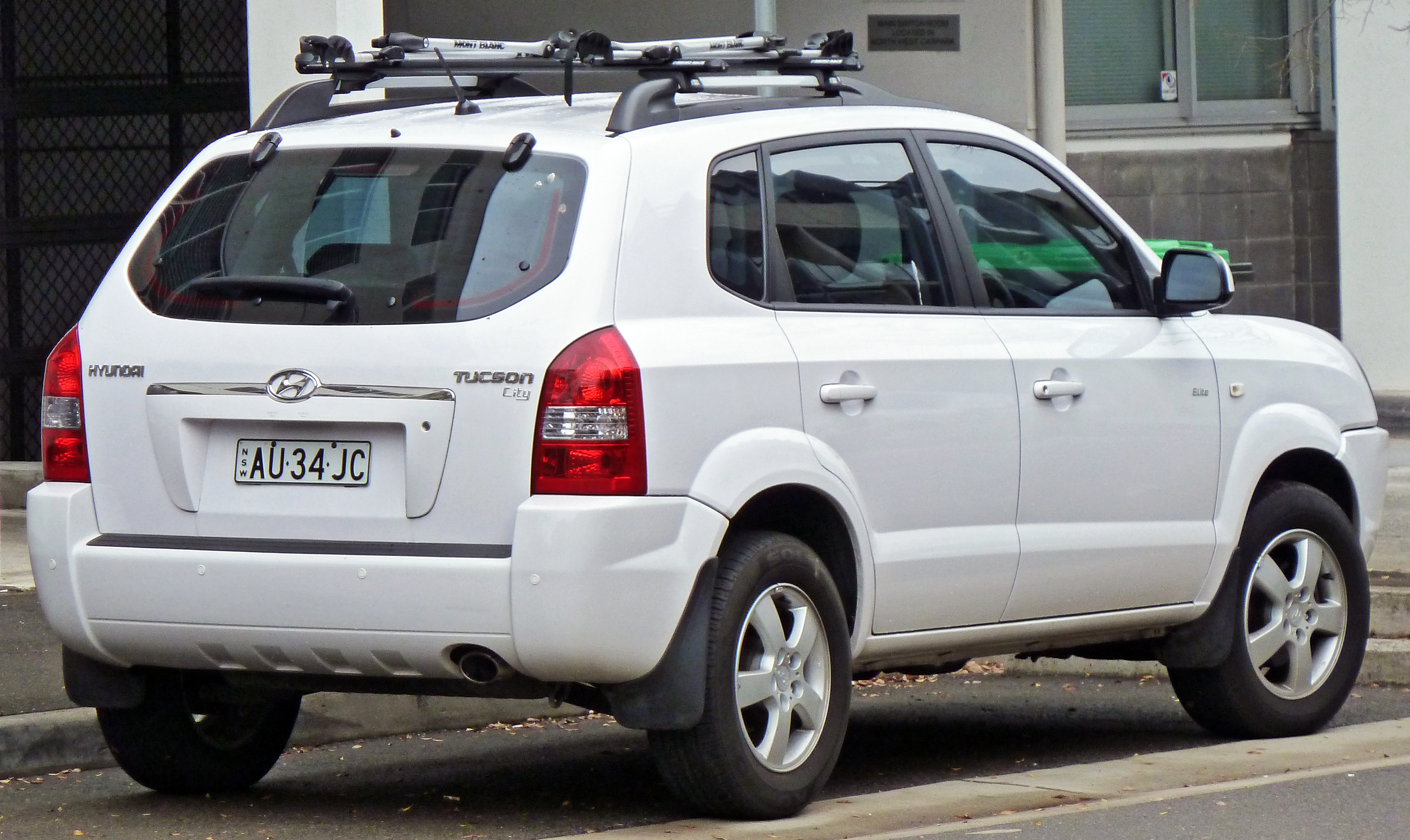
Rear view

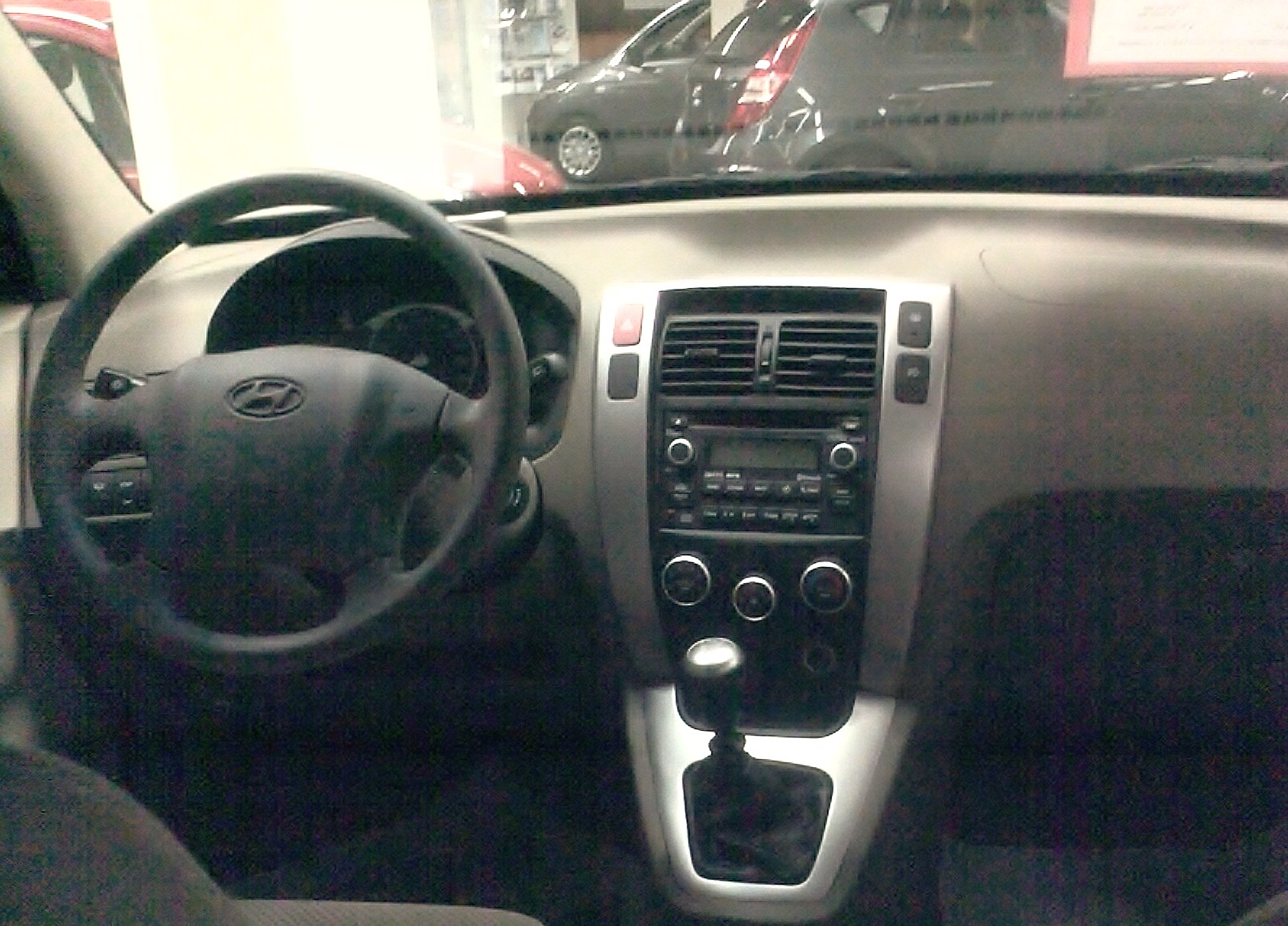
Interior

The first-generation Tucson was launched in 2004, after its name was announced in November 2003. Positioned as a smaller alternative to the Santa Fe, it shared its Hyundai Elantra-based platform with the second-generation Kia Sportage.

=== Markets ===
==== North America ====
In the U.S., the Tucson was offered in base GLS, mid-line SE, and top-tier Limited (formerly LX) trim levels for 2007 models. Earlier 2005 and 2006 models were offered as GL/GLS/LX (Limited). Standard equipment included air conditioning, six airbags, electronic stability control, a CD player, alloy wheels, remote keyless entry, and premium cloth seats. The SE added to the roster with contrasting grey body cladding, a different alloy design, an AM/FM/Cassette/CD as well as fog lights and a front windshield wiper de-icing grid. The Limited added leather seating surfaces, a 6-disc in dash CD changer, body-coloured cladding, automatic climate control, and heated seats. The GLS and Limited were only available with the 2.7 L V6. The GL came only with the 2.0-litre four-cylinder.

The Tucson offers modest cargo space but its easy-to-fold seats can expand this volume so they lie flat. Even the front passenger seat folds flat for extra-long cargo.

===== Safety =====
There are dual-stage frontal impact airbags, torso side-impact airbags built into the front seats, and curtain airbags for side-impact protection for front and rear passengers.

The 2009 Hyundai Tucson was rated by the U.S. National Highway Traffic Safety Administration (NHTSA):

- Frontal Rating (Driver):
- Frontal Rating (Passenger):
- Side Rating (Driver):
- Side Rating (Passenger):

===== Model year changes =====
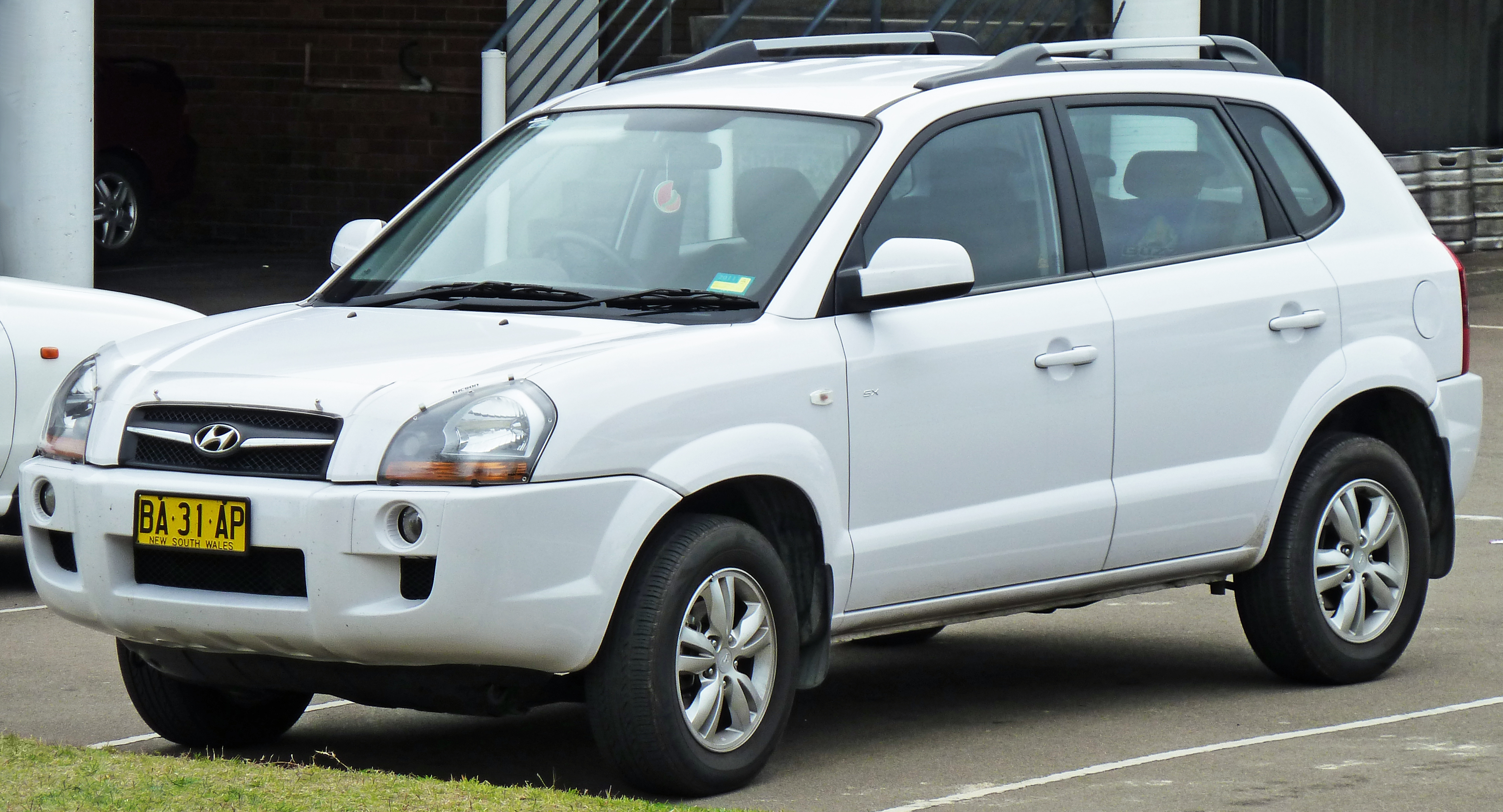
Hyundai Tucson City SX (Australia; facelift)

In 2006, the LX became the Limited and got colour-coded cladding, automatic climate control, and a high-performance sound system. The GLS retained the gray cladding but 'HYUNDAI' is no longer branded into the cladding on the front doors. The GLS also got improved cloth seats with the option of a heating element. Both GLS and Limited got redesigned alloy wheels. The base GL remained unchanged.

In 2007, the GL and GLS trims were respectively renamed to GLS and SE to match the standard for all new Hyundai vehicles. The SE comes with a sport utility rack, has 4-wheel drive, and is a 6-cylinder engine.

2009 Tucsons saw restyling and trim changes.

===== Tucson FCEV =====
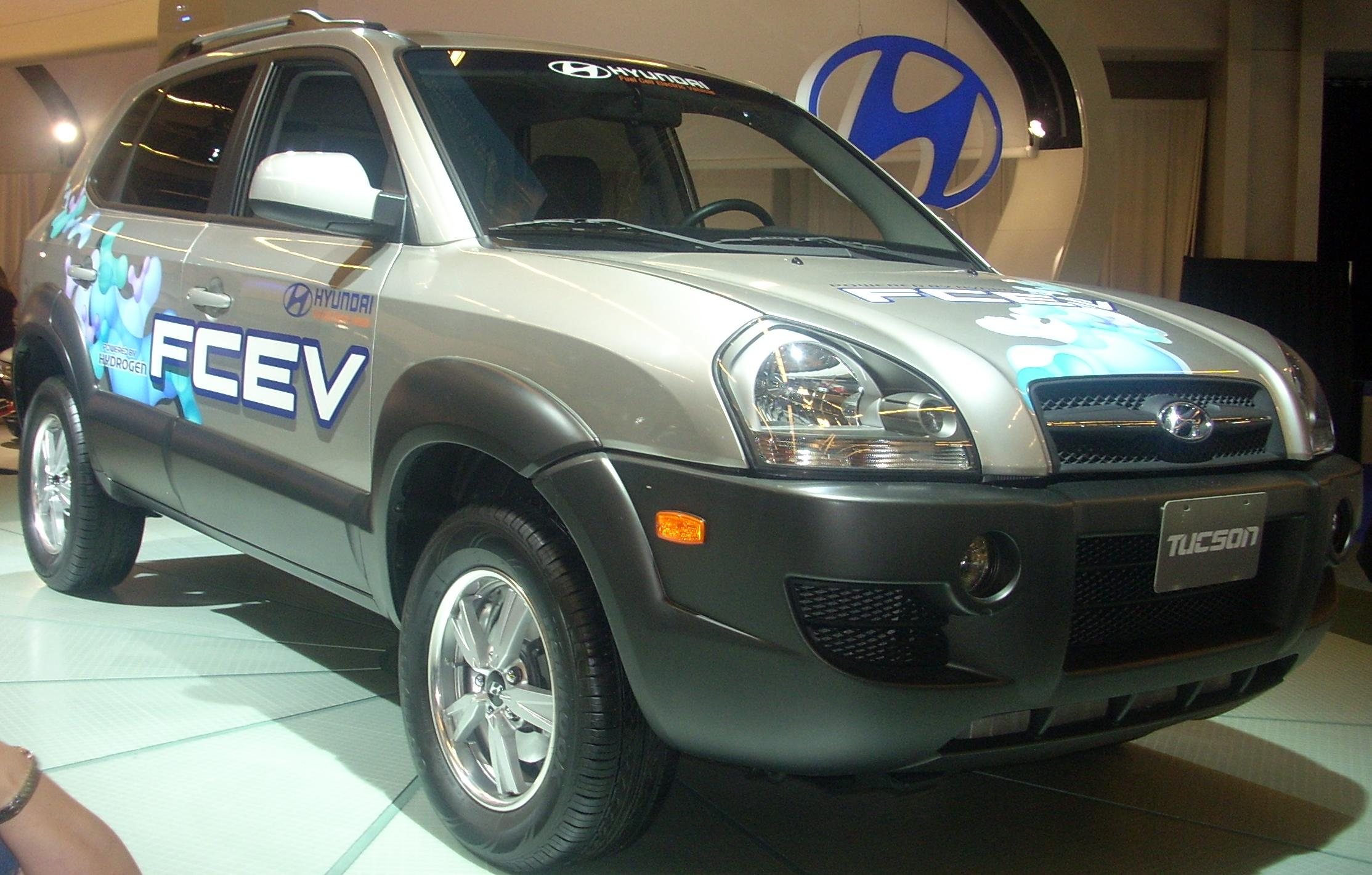
Hyundai Tucson FCEV

The Tucson Fuel Cell Electric Vehicle (FCEV) is a test fuel cell vehicle for Hyundai's second-generation hydrogen fuel cell. The vehicle includes an 80 kW electric motor by Enova Systems of Torrance, California, UTC Fuel Cells by South Windsor, Connecticut, 152V battery co-developed by Hyundai Motor Co. and LG Chem in Seoul, Korea, 152 litres (33 imp gal; 40 US gal) hydrogen storage tanks developed by Dynetek Industries of Calgary, Alberta, Canada. The vehicle has range of 300 kilometres (186.4 mi) and top speed of 150 km/h (93 mph).

The vehicle was unveiled at the 2005 Los Angeles Auto Show, and completed a 4,300-mile (6,900 km) journey as part of the Hydrogen Road Tour in 2008.

==== Other markets ====
In Japan, the Hyundai Tucson was sold as the Hyundai JM until November 2009. The model platform nameplate was adopted directly, because it was impossible applied for place names as trademarks under Japan's trademark system after 2002. According to Hyundai Japan the JM means to Joyful Mover.

In Brazil, the Hyundai Tucson was produced from October 2009 until the second half of 2018, initially in GL and GLS trim levels - the former available only with a 2.0-litre four-cylinder engine and a choice between a 5-speed manual transmission or a 4-speed automatic transmission, and the latter offering a 2.7-litre V6 engine in addition to the 2.0-litre four-cylinder, both mated exclusively to the 4-speed auto.

A facelifted version of the first-generation exclusive to China was produced by Beijing Hyundai. The second-generation Tucson was renamed to ix35 in China and Brazil, and later became an independent model while the Tucson name returned with the introduction of the third-generation.

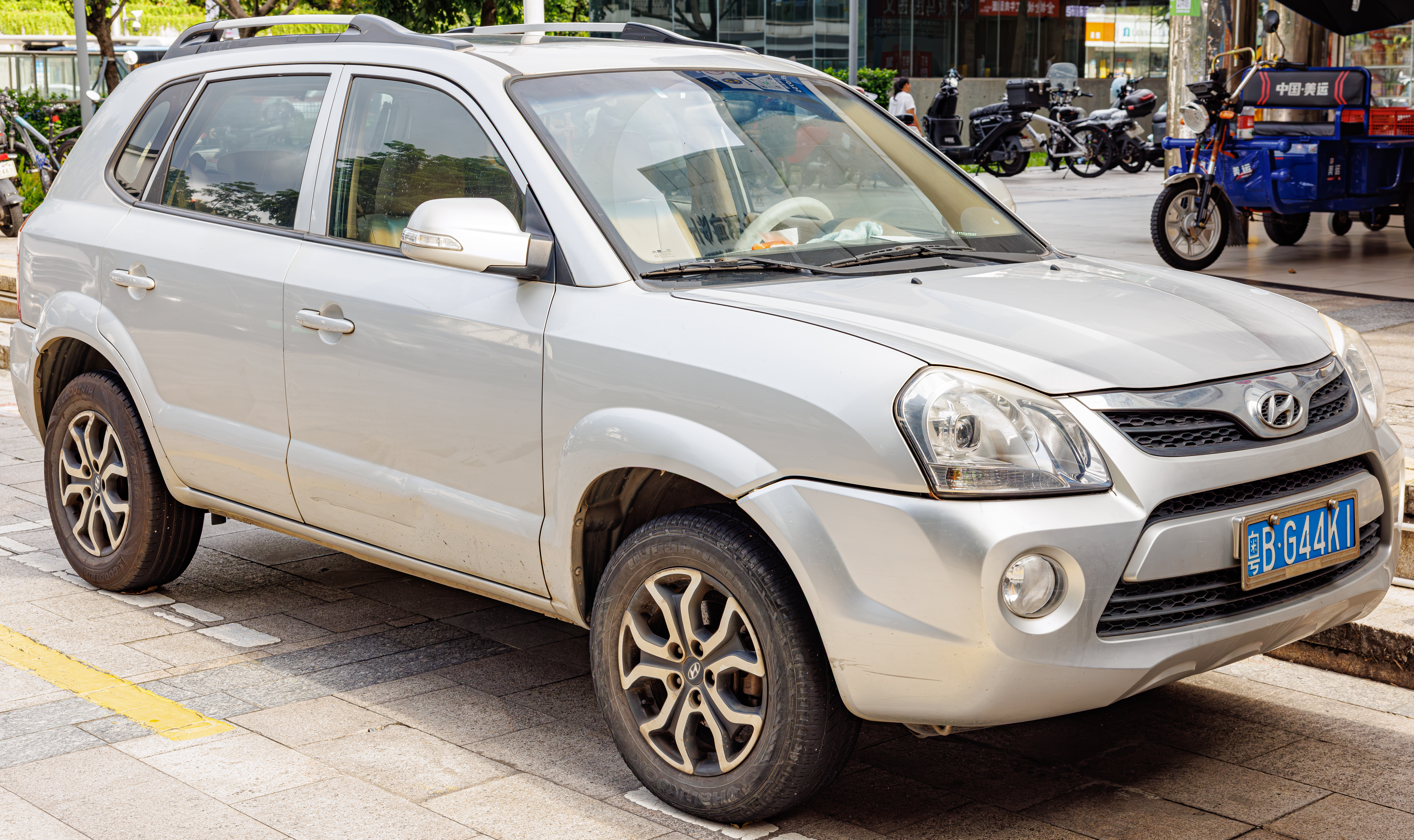
Hyundai Tucson (China; facelift)

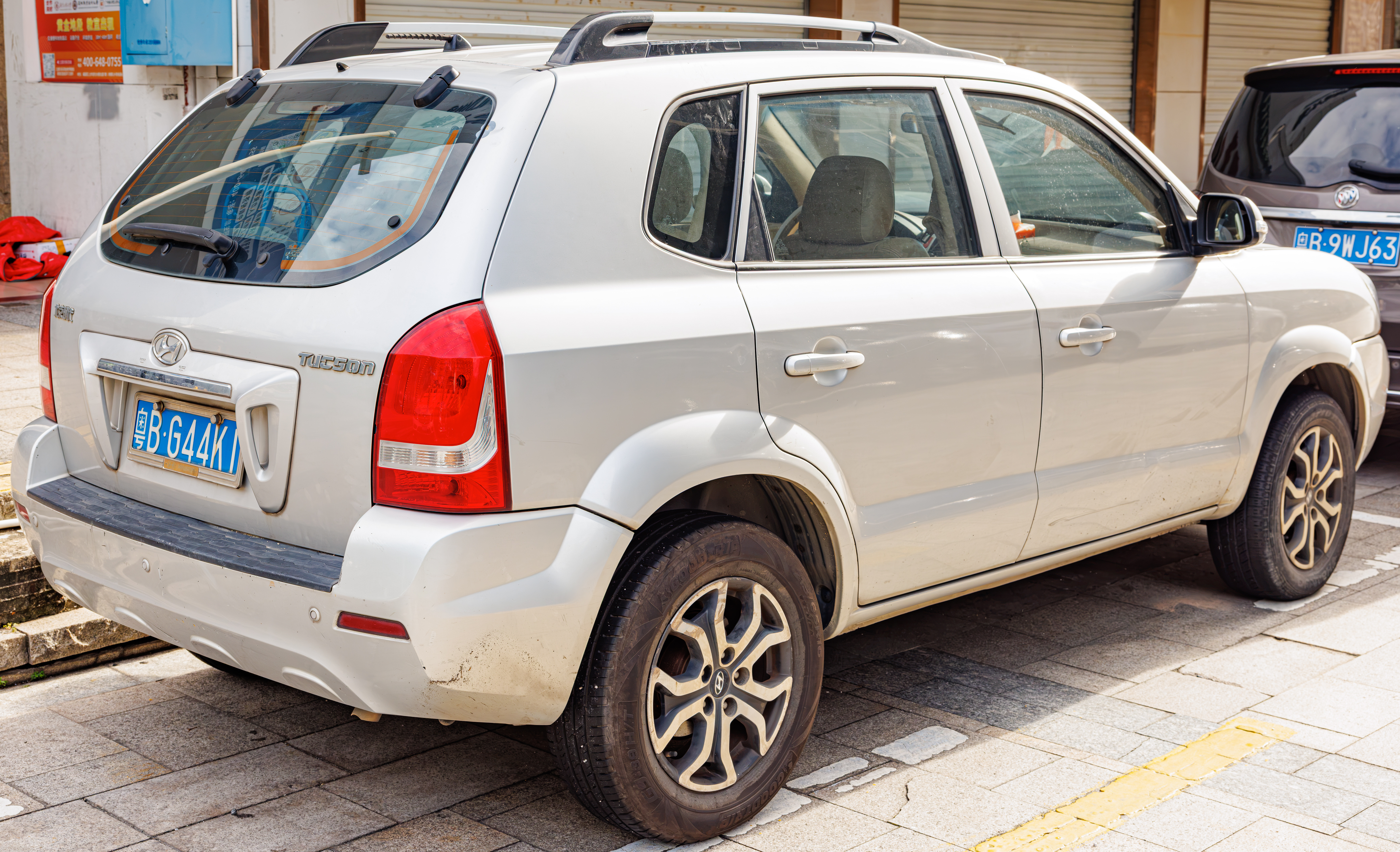
Hyundai Tucson rear view (China; facelift)

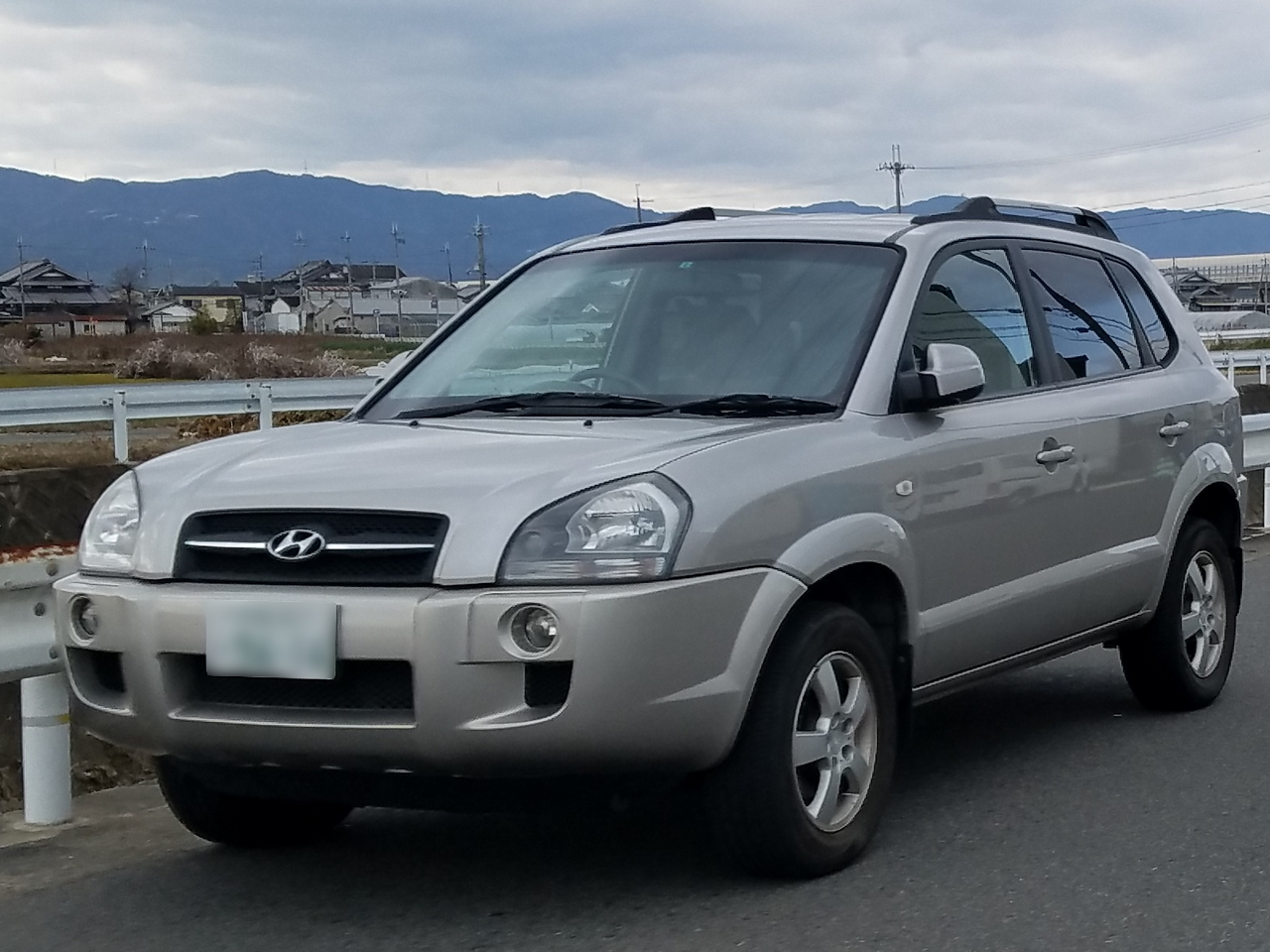
Hyundai JM

=== Powertrain ===
Specs
| Model | Years | Transmission | Power | Torque | 0–100 km/h (0–62 mph) (official) | Top speed |
Petrol
| Beta II 2.0 | 2004–2009 | 5-speed manual | 142 PS (104 kW; 140 hp) @ 6,000 rpm | 18.8 kg⋅m (184 N⋅m; 136 lbf⋅ft) @ 4,500 rpm | 10.4s (FWD); 11.3s (AWD) | 180 km/h (112 mph) (FWD); 174 km/h (108 mph) (AWD) |
| Beta II 2.0 | 2004–2009 | 4-speed automatic | 142 PS (104 kW; 140 hp) @ 6,000 rpm | 18.8 kg⋅m (184 N⋅m; 136 lbf⋅ft) @ 4,500 rpm | | 174 km/h (108 mph) (FWD) |
| Delta 2.7 | 2004–2009 | 4-speed automatic | 175 PS (129 kW; 173 hp) @ 6,000 rpm | 24.6 kg⋅m (241 N⋅m; 178 lbf⋅ft) @ 4,000 rpm | 10.5s | 180 km/h (112 mph) |
Diesel
| D 2.0 CRDi | 2004–2009 | 5-speed manual | 113 PS (83 kW; 111 hp) @ 4,000 rpm | 25 kg⋅m (245 N⋅m; 181 lbf⋅ft) @ 1,800–2,500 rpm | 13.1s (FWD); 13.8s (AWD) | 168 km/h (104 mph) |
| D 2.0 CRDi | 2004–2009 | 4-speed automatic | 113 PS (83 kW; 111 hp) @ 4,000 rpm | 25 kg⋅m (245 N⋅m; 181 lbf⋅ft) @ 1,800–2,500 rpm | 15.1s (FWD); 16.1s (AWD) | 162 km/h (101 mph) |
| D 2.0 CRDi | 2006–2009 | 6-speed manual | 140 PS (103 kW; 138 hp) @ 4,000 rpm 150 PS (110 kW; 148 hp) @ 4,000 rpm | 31.1 kg⋅m (305 N⋅m; 225 lbf⋅ft) @ 1,800–2,500 rpm | 11.1s (FWD); 12.0s (AWD) | 178 km/h (111 mph) (FWD); 177 km/h (110 mph) (AWD) |
| D 2.0 CRDi | 2006–2009 | 4-speed automatic | 140 PS (103 kW; 138 hp) @ 4,000 rpm 150 PS (110 kW; 148 hp) @ 4,000 rpm | 31.1 kg⋅m (305 N⋅m; 225 lbf⋅ft) @ 1,800–2,500 rpm | 12.8s (FWD) | 175 km/h (109 mph) (FWD) |

=== Reception ===
The Hyundai Tucson received accolades from Canadian Car of the Year Best New Crossover award for 2005. It was named as one of the most reliable vehicles from the 2009 Consumer Reports reliability survey.

=== Safety ===
The first-generation Tucson in its standard European market configuration received 4 stars for adult occupants, 3 stars for toddlers, and 1 star for pedestrians from Euro NCAP in 2006.

ANCAP test results* Hyundai Tucson Elite variant (2006)
| Test | Score |
|---|---|
| Overall | 4 /5 stars |
| Frontal offset | 11.42/16 |
| Side impact | 16/16 |
| Pole | 2/2 |
| Seat belt reminders | 0/3 |
| Whiplash protection | Not Assessed |
| Pedestrian protection | Poor |
| Electronic stability control | Not Assessed |

== Second generation (LM; 2009) ==
Second generation
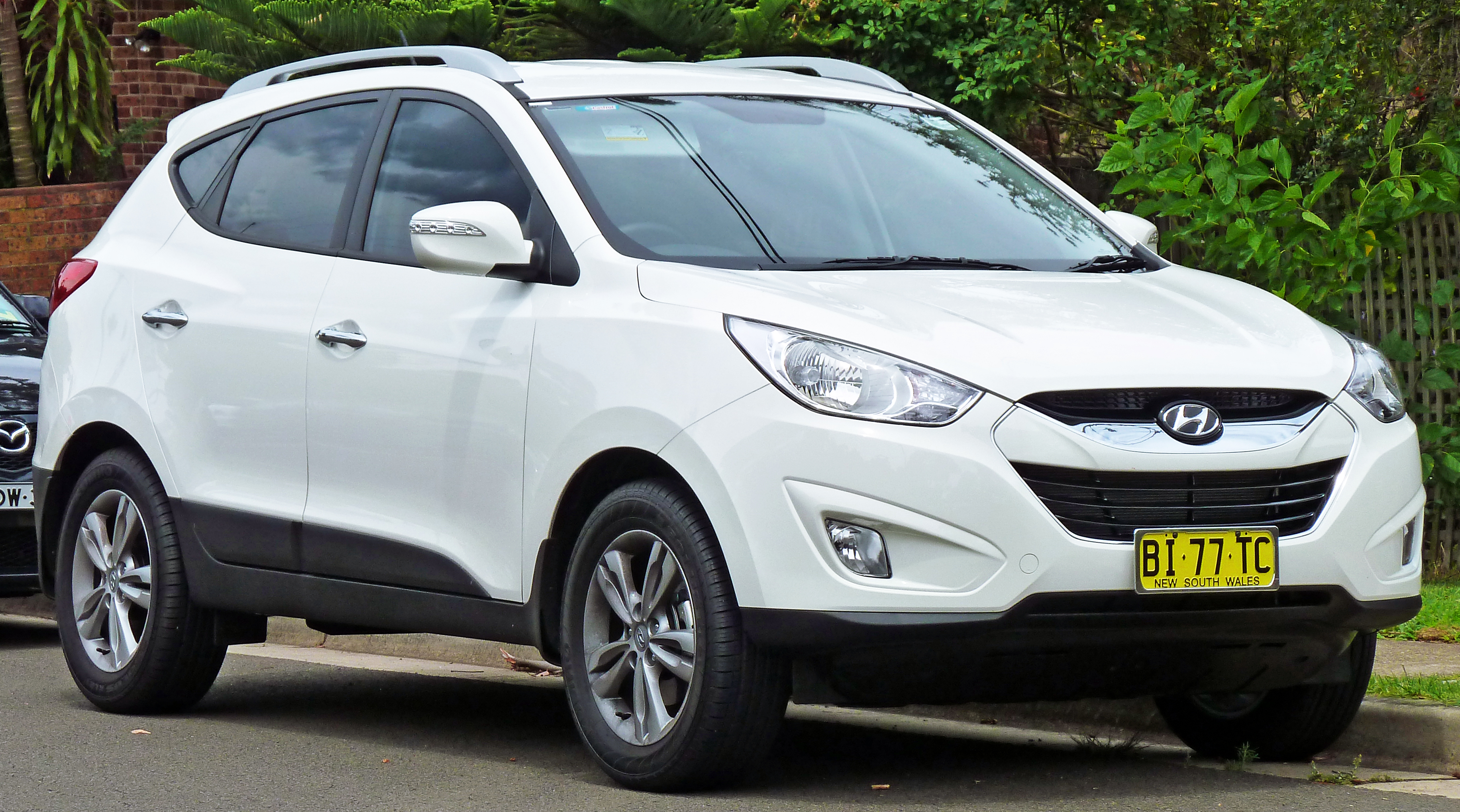
- 2010 Hyundai ix35 Elite (Australia; pre-facelift)

Overview
- Model code: LM
- Also called: Hyundai ix35 Hyundai Tucson ix
- Production: 2009–2015; 2010–2022 (Brazil)
- Model years: 2010–2015
- Assembly: South Korea: Ulsan; Czech Republic: Nošovice (HMMC); Slovakia: Žilina (Kia Motors Slovakia); China: Beijing (Beijing Hyundai); Brazil: Anápolis (Hyundai Caoa); Taiwan: Hukou, Hsinchu (SYM Motors); Indonesia: Bekasi (HIM); Malaysia: Kulim, Kedah (Inokom); Egypt: Cairo (Ghabbour Group)
- Designer: Cha Il-Hoei; Kim Sung-No (facelift); Thomas Bürkle (chief designer)

Body and chassis
- Related: Hyundai ix35 (NU); Hyundai Avante/Elantra (MD/UD); Hyundai i30 (GD); Kia Sportage (SL); Kia Ceed (JD); Kia Forte (YD)

Powertrain
- Engine: Petrol: 1.6 L Gamma GDi I4; 2.0 L Nu GDi I4; 2.0 L Theta II MPi I4; 2.4 L Theta II MPi I4; Diesel: 1.7 L U II CRDi-VGT I4; 2.0 L R II CRDi-VGT I4
- Transmission: 5-speed manual; 6-speed manual; 6-speed automatic

Dimensions
- Wheelbase: 2,640 mm (103.9 in)
- Length: 4,410 mm (173.6 in)
- Width: 1,820 mm (71.7 in)
- Height: 1,655–1,685 mm (65.2–66.3 in)
- Curb weight: 1,410–1,643 kg (3,109–3,622 lb)

Chronology
- Successor: Hyundai ix35 (NU) (China)

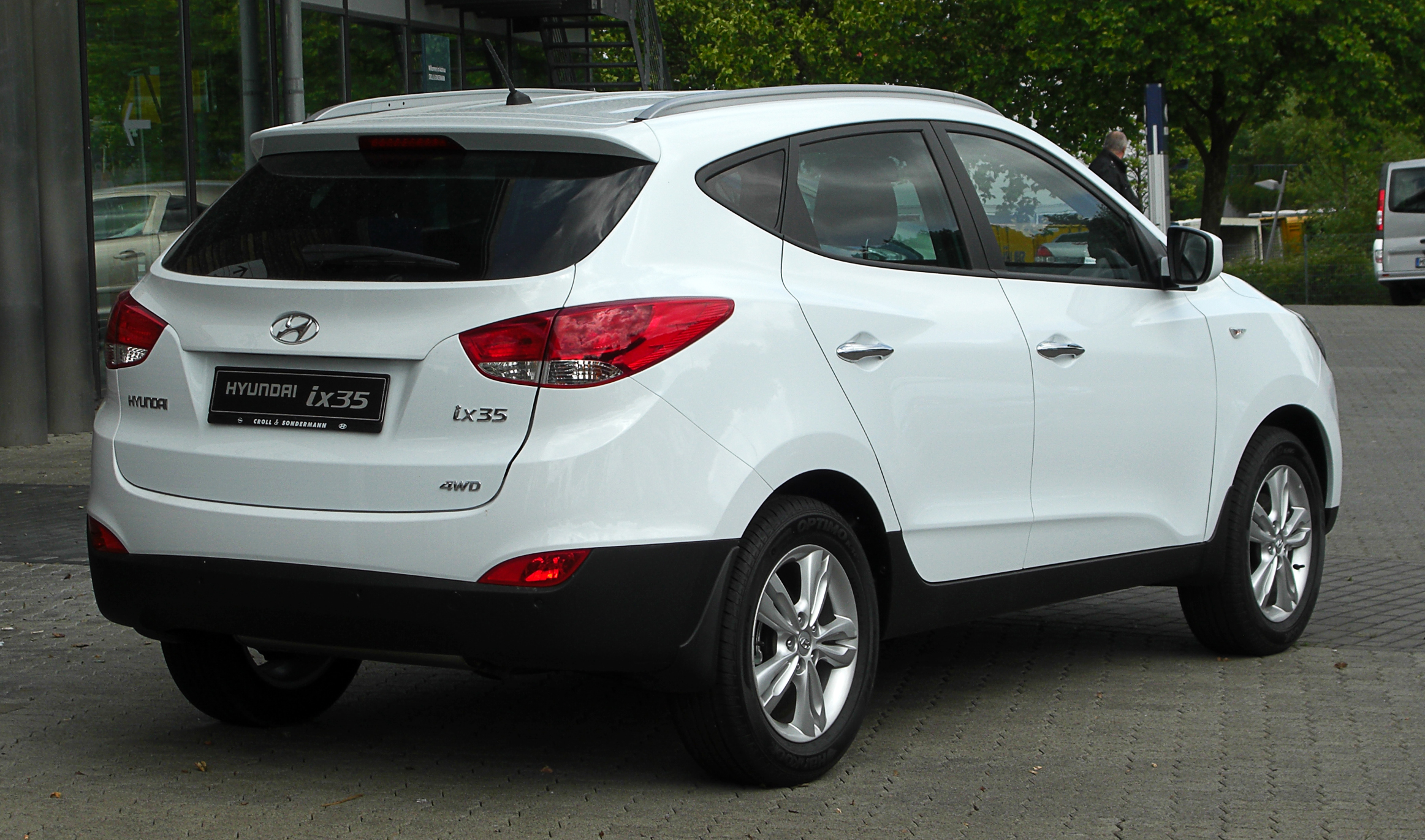
Rear view (pre-facelift)

In most markets outside South Korea and North America, the Hyundai Tucson name (also known as the "Hyundai Tucson ix" in Korea) was changed to Hyundai ix35. Vehicles sold in the North America and several other regions continued to be called Tucson. The ix35 was unveiled at the 2009 Frankfurt Motor Show. The power output, fuel-efficiency, comfort and safety features were claimed to have been all upgraded. Known by the project name LM, it took 36 months and 280 billion won (approx. US$225 million) to develop.

The ix35's styling was reported to be based on Hyundai ix-onic concept. The ix35 was penned by Hyundai designer Cha Il-Hoei in 2007, under the guidance of former BMW designer Thomas Bürkle at Hyundai's Rüsselsheim design studio in Germany and continues the company's styling language, marketed as "fluidic sculpture". The compact crossover vehicle has sweeping coupe-like lines, a premium vehicle feel and comes with features unavailable on its predecessor.

=== Facelift ===
The facelifted Tucson was released in South Korea on 2 May 2013, based on the European market ix35 styling with new grille, projector headlights, tail lights, rounded fog lights and front bumper. This facelift was also released in China in August 2013 under the ix35 nameplate, and was not applied in most markets outside South Korea and China, especially in Europe, where only headlights and tail lights were changed, and in North America and Australia, where it retained the pre-facelift styling with only headlights were changed. While in Indonesia, the Tucson received its own facelift in April 2014 based on the global model styling with new grille (similar to the South Korean and Chinese markets), projector headlights, tail lights and fog lights.

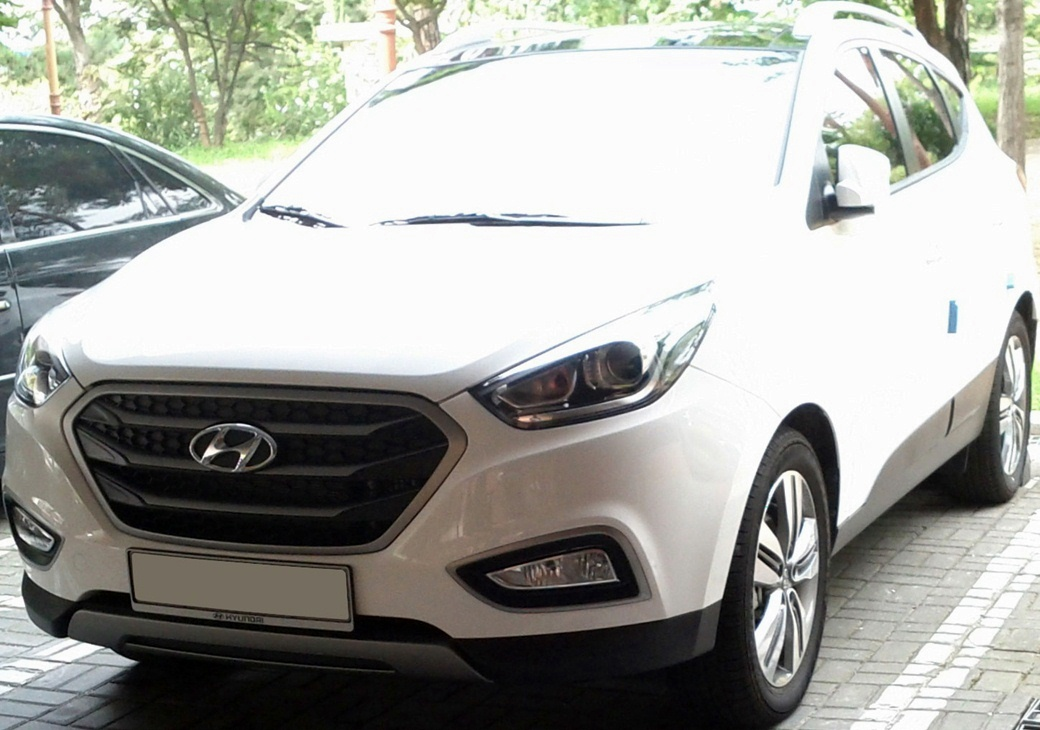
2013 Hyundai Tucson (South Korea, facelift)

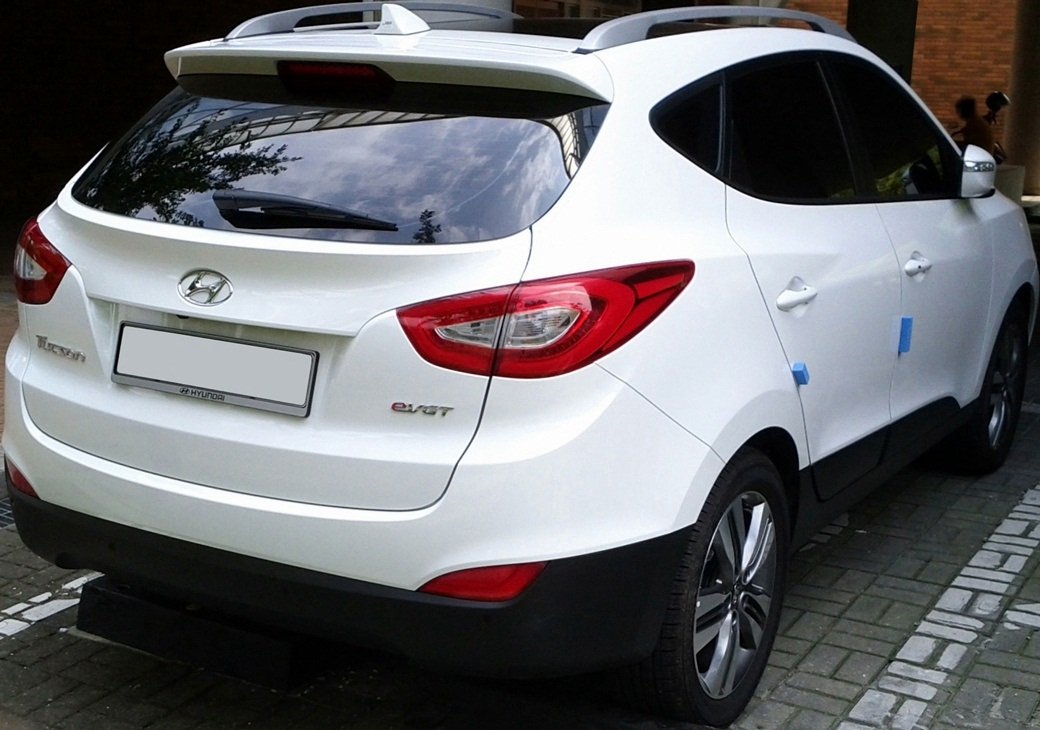
2013 Hyundai Tucson (South Korea, facelift)

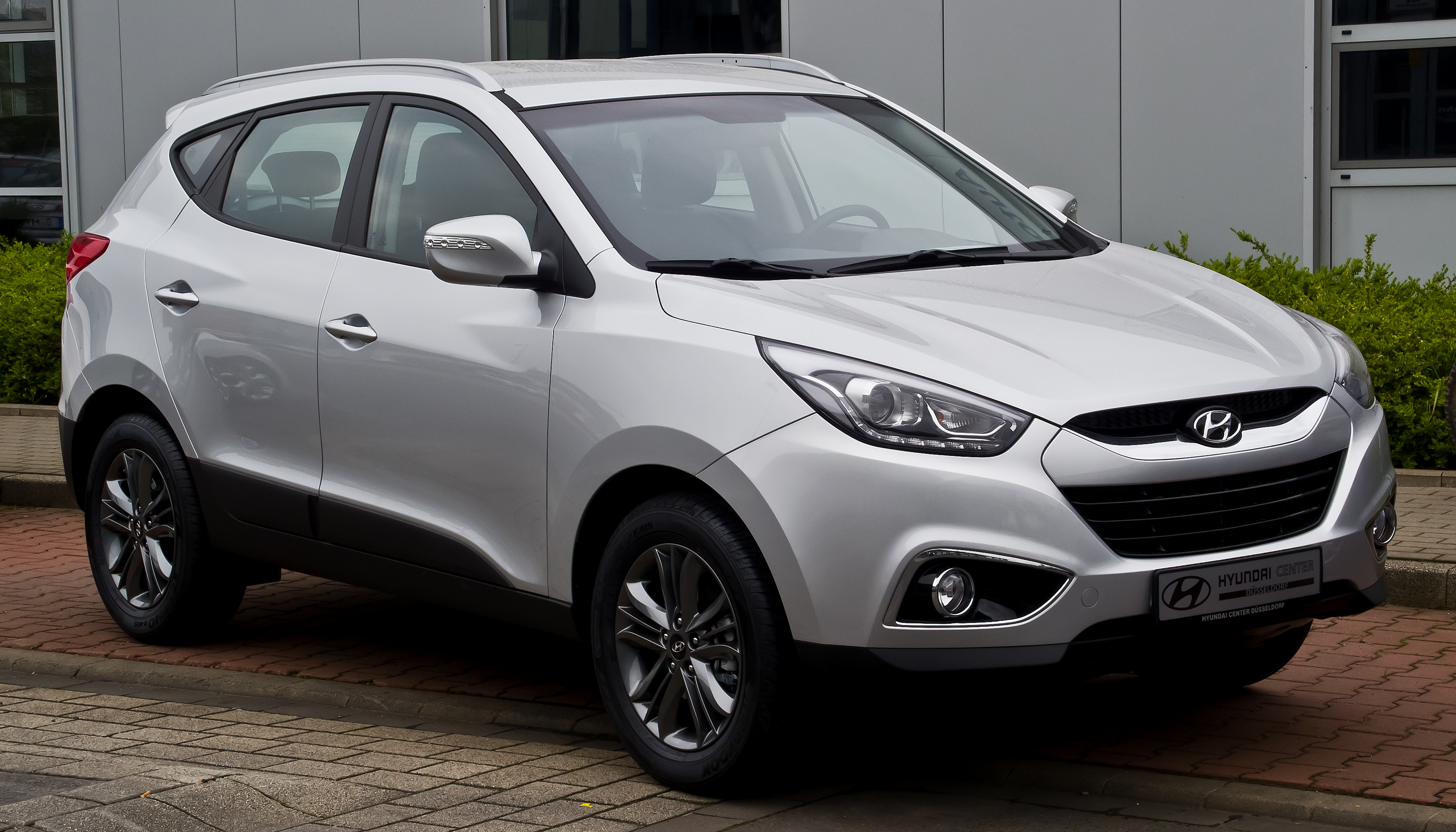
2014 Hyundai ix35 (Germany, facelift)

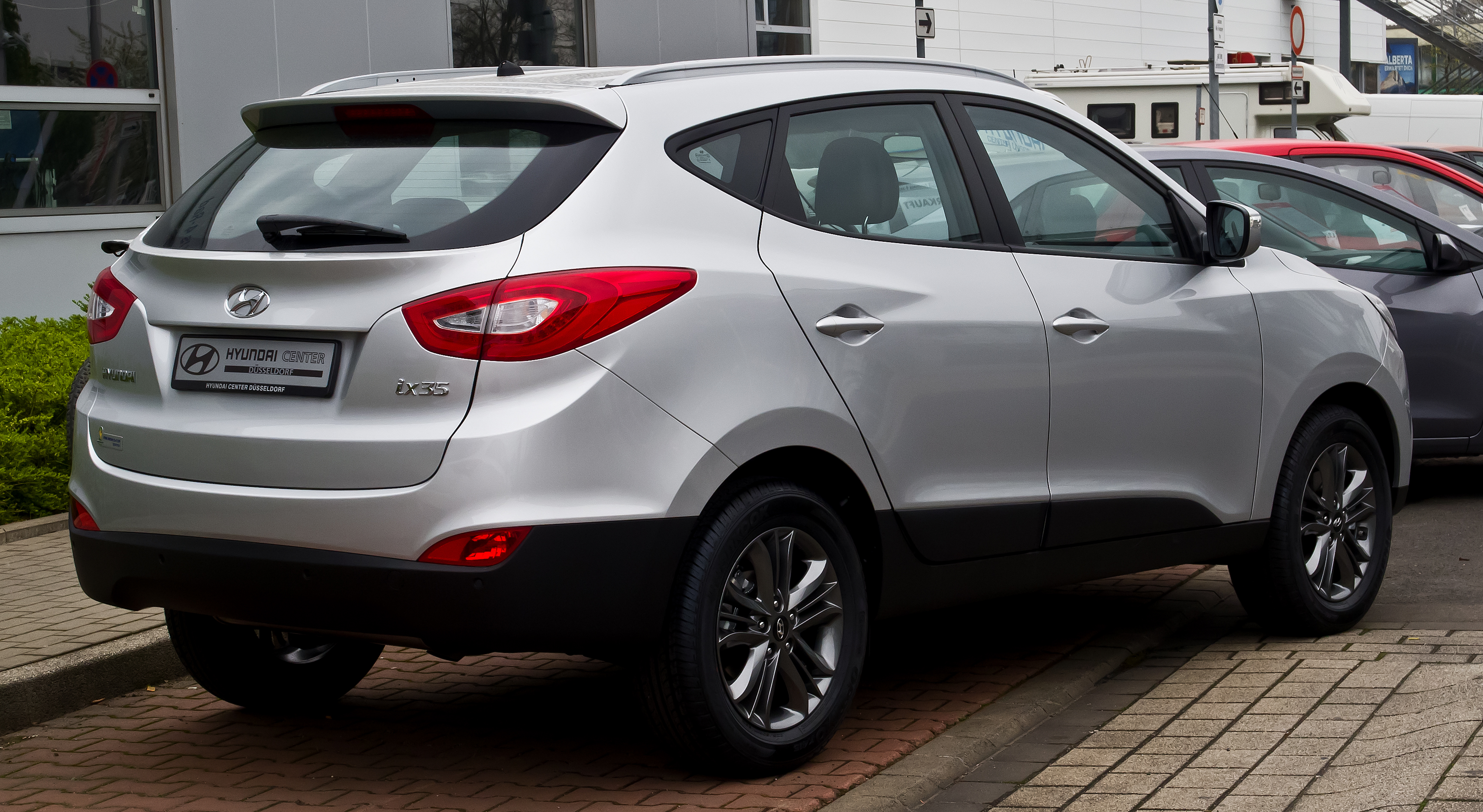
2014 Hyundai ix35 (Germany, facelift)

=== Markets ===
==== Australia ====
In Australia, the ix35 is available in Active, Elite and Highlander trim levels. The 2.0-litre Theta II petrol engine in front-wheel drive is available on Active and Elite trims, while the 2.4-litre Theta II petrol engine and the 2.0-litre R-series diesel engine are available on Elite and Highlander trims.

==== China ====
In China, the first-generation Tucson was sold alongside the ix35, which adopted the European market styling, and was replaced by the third-generation Tucson directly while the ix35 spawned its own successor, the Hyundai ix35 (NU). The ix35 NU was revealed on the 2017 Shanghai Auto Show in China and was available to the Chinese car market in the third quarter of 2017.

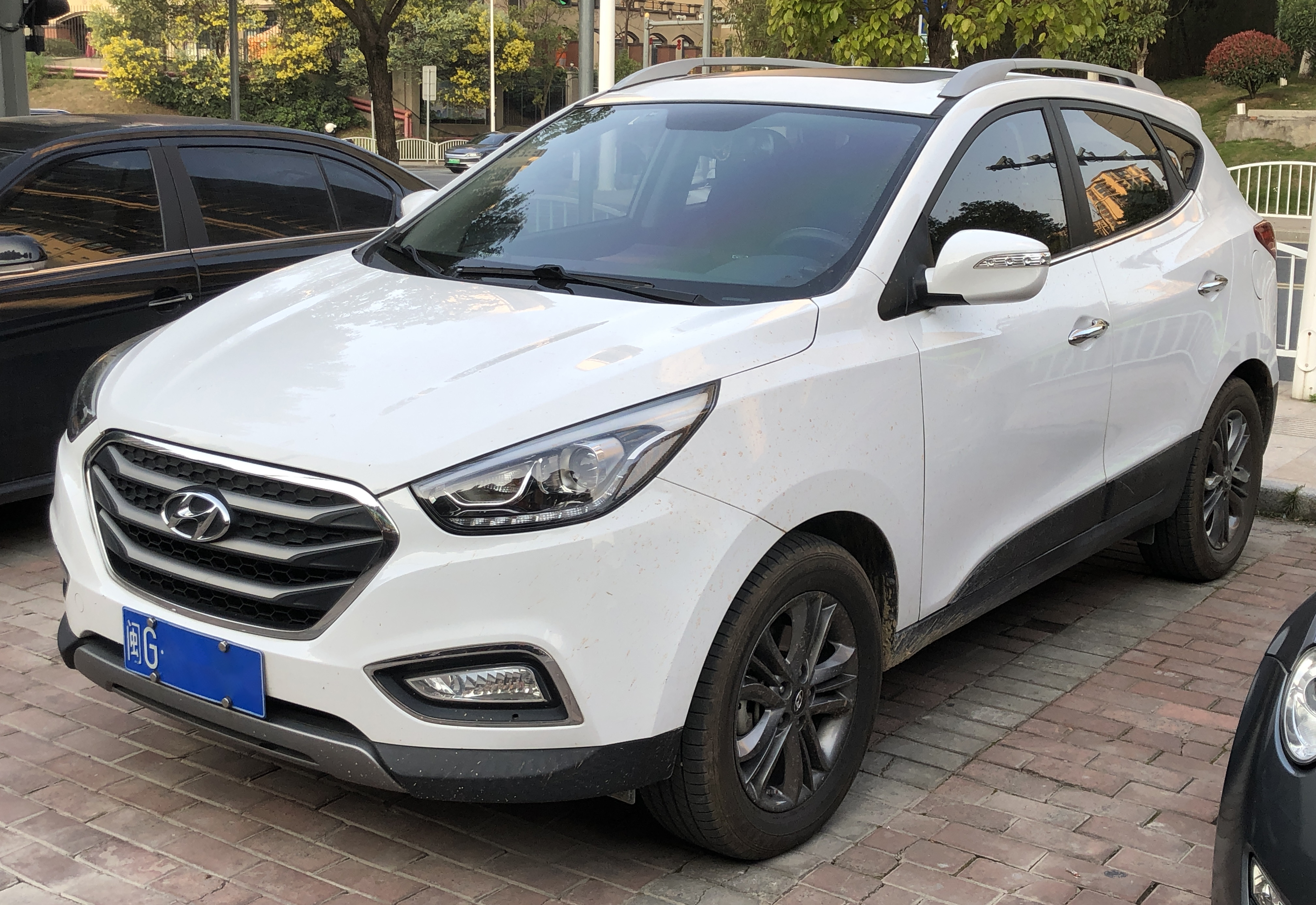
Hyundai ix35 (China, facelift)

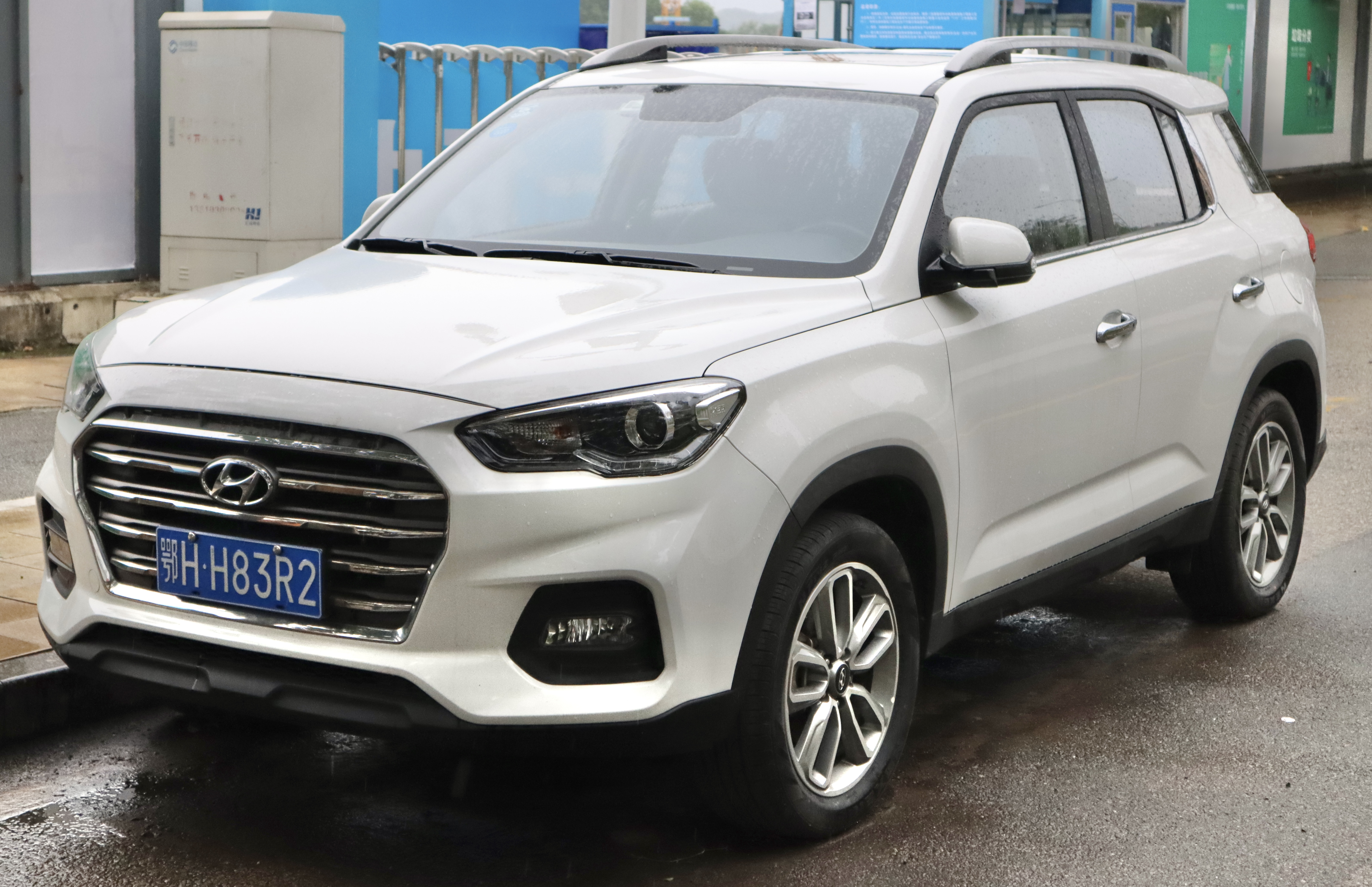
Second-generation Hyundai ix35 (China)

==== Europe ====
The European market ix35 has a restyled grille, front bumper, rounded fog lights and projector headlights, to differentiate it with global models. This styling was also sold in Malaysia from November 2012 as the Tucson.

In the United Kingdom, the ix35 was initially available in Style and Premium trim levels. It received an update in September 2013 with new headlights and tail lights, and is available in S, SE and Premium trim levels.

==== North America ====
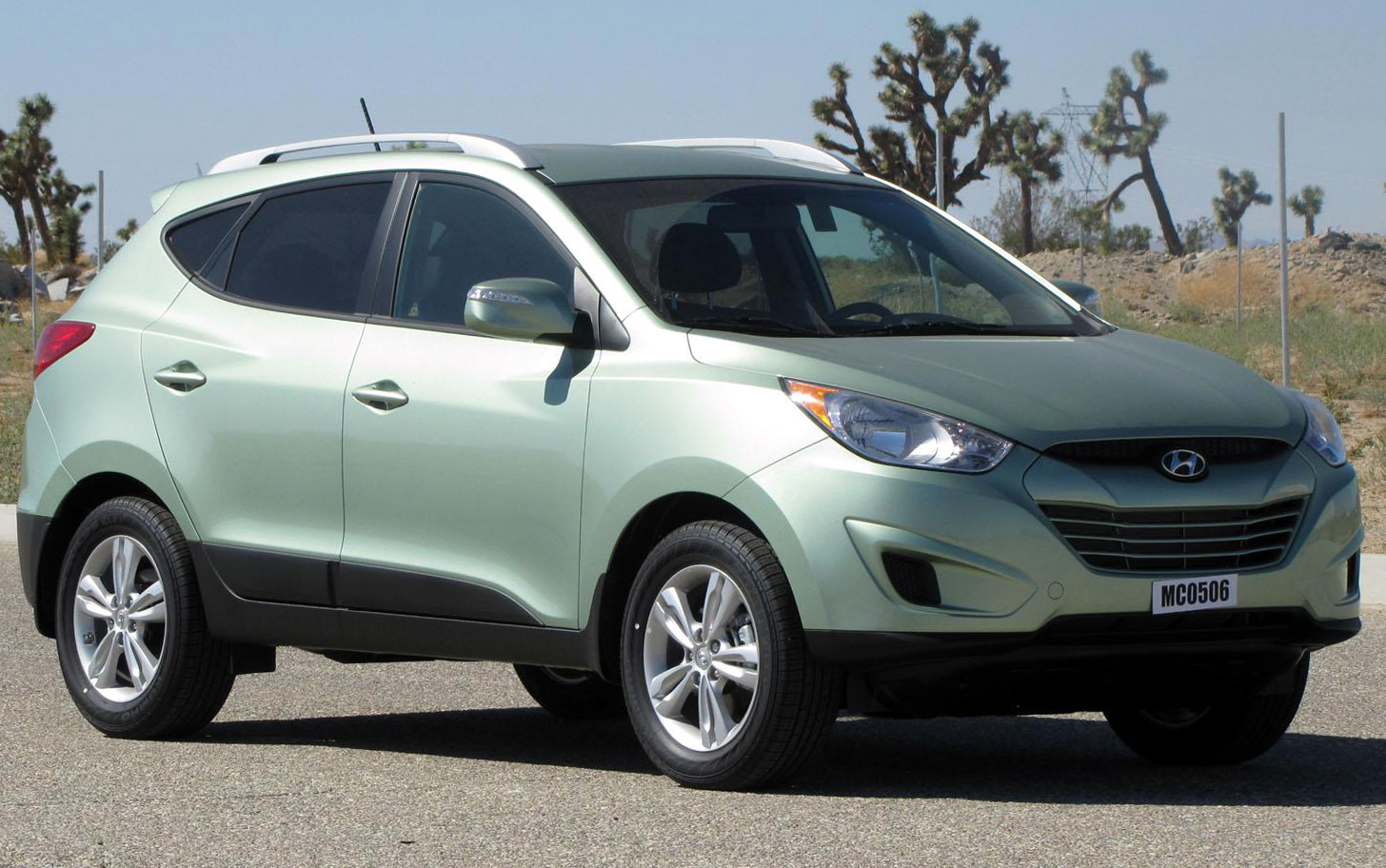
2012 Hyundai Tucson GLS

The Tucson sold in the United States came in three trims: GL, GLS and Limited, with all-wheel drive available for GLS and Limited trims. The GL comes with a standard manual transmission, but a 6-speed automatic transmission is available and is standard on GLS and Limited. The North American version uses a different gauge cluster design than the Korean version.

The 2011 Tucson offered in the U.S. a new GL trim which replaces the 2010 GLS model as Tucson's base trim. The GL is powered by a new 2.0-litre 4-cylinder engine mated to either a five-speed manual or an available six-speed automatic transmission in order to obtain better fuel economy than the 2.4-litre engine.

For the 2014 model year, the Tucson was upgraded with GDI direct injected Theta II engines that obtain more power and better emissions, LED tail/head lights, more stylish alloy rim designs, and a few minor improvements to the interior/audio system.

=== Powertrain ===
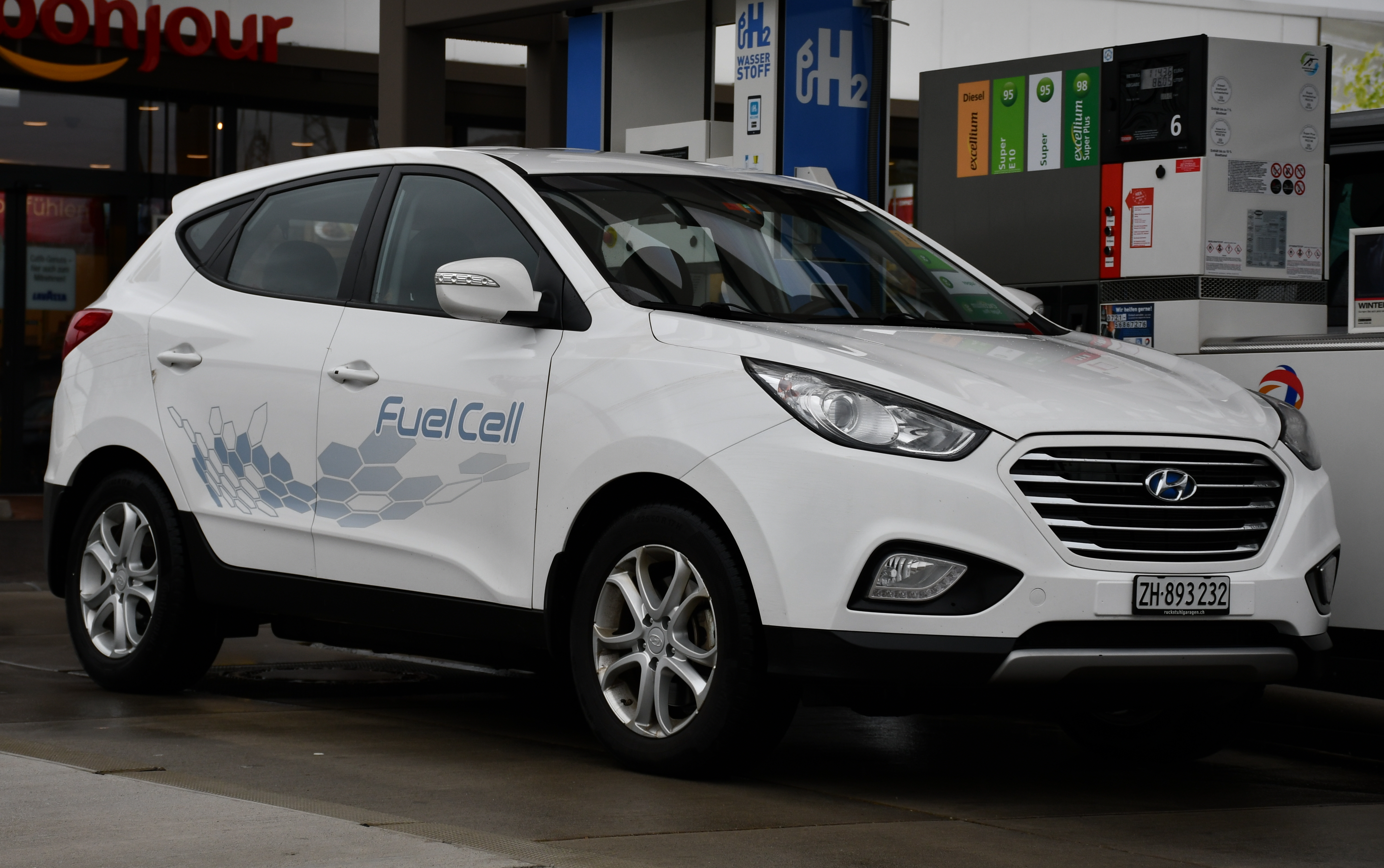
Hyundai ix35 FCEV

The Tucson/ix35 is available with several engines: an all-new 2.0-litre diesel R engine, one of two Theta-II petrol engine variants (2.0-litre or 2.4-litre), 1.7-litre UII diesel and 1.6-litre Gamma GDI petrol. The later two only in Europe. The automatic transmission is Hyundai's all-new six-speed design. The manual transmissions available in Europe is a 6-speed for 1.7-litre and 2.0-litre diesels and 1.6 Gamma and a 5-speed for 2.0 Theta. The 2.0-litre diesel engine, available outside of North America, meets the Euro-5 emissions standards and achieves 6.5 l/100 km (15.4 km/L; 36.2 mpg_{‑US}) fuel economy with maximum power output of 184 hp (187 PS; 137 kW). The 2.0-litre petrol engine has a fuel economy of 8.5 l/100 km (11.8 km/L; 27.7 mpg_{‑US}) with 166 hp (168 PS; 124 kW). In South Korea, the diesel engine is offered in both front-wheel drive and all-wheel drive configurations, while the 2.0-litre petrol engine is available only in front-wheel drive.

The North American versions are powered by either the 2.0-litre producing 165 hp (167 PS; 123 kW) or a 2.4-litre four-cylinder petrol engine producing 176 hp (178 PS; 131 kW) mated to the six-speed automatic transmission. The 2.4-litre engine makes almost the same power as the previous generation V6 engine while managing 20% better fuel economy than the previous generation four-cylinder.

Specs
| Model | Years | Transmission | Power | Torque | 0–100 km/h (0–62 mph) (official) | Top speed |
Petrol
| Gamma II 1.6 GDi | 2009–2015 | 6-speed manual | 135 PS (99 kW; 133 hp) @ 6,300 rpm | 16.7 kg⋅m (164 N⋅m; 121 lbf⋅ft) @ 4,850 rpm | 11.1s | 178 km/h (111 mph) |
| Theta II 2.0 MPi | 2009–2015 | 5-speed manual | 166 PS (122 kW; 164 hp) @ 6,200 rpm | 20.1 kg⋅m (197 N⋅m; 145 lbf⋅ft) @ 4,600 rpm | 10.4s (FWD); 10.7s (AWD) | 184 km/h (114 mph) (FWD); 182 km/h (113 mph) (AWD) |
| Theta II 2.0 MPi | 2009–2015 | 6-speed automatic | 166 PS (122 kW; 164 hp) @ 6,200 rpm | 20.1 kg⋅m (197 N⋅m; 145 lbf⋅ft) @ 4,600 rpm | 10.6s (FWD); 11.2s (AWD) | 182 km/h (113 mph) (FWD); 180 km/h (112 mph) (AWD) |
| Nu 2.0 GDi | 2013–2015 | 6-speed manual | 166 PS (122 kW; 164 hp) @ 6,200 rpm | 20.9 kg⋅m (205 N⋅m; 151 lbf⋅ft) @ 4,000 rpm | 10.4s (FWD); 10.7s (AWD) | 196 km/h (122 mph) (FWD); 195 km/h (121 mph) (AWD) |
| Nu 2.0 GDi | 2013–2015 | 6-speed automatic | 166 PS (122 kW; 164 hp) @ 6,200 rpm | 20.9 kg⋅m (205 N⋅m; 151 lbf⋅ft) @ 4,000 rpm | 10.4s (FWD); 11.0s (AWD) | 183 km/h (114 mph) (FWD); 181 km/h (112 mph) (AWD) |
| Theta II 2.4 MPi | 2009–2015 | 6-speed automatic | 177 PS (130 kW; 175 hp) @ 6,000 rpm | 23.1 kg⋅m (227 N⋅m; 167 lbf⋅ft) @ 4,000 rpm | 10.0s | 185 km/h (115 mph) |
Diesel
| U II 1.7 CRDi | 2009–2015 | 6-speed manual | 116 PS (85 kW; 114 hp) @ 4,000 rpm | 26.5 kg⋅m (260 N⋅m; 192 lbf⋅ft) @ 1,250–2,750 rpm | 12.4s | 173 km/h (107 mph) |
| R II 2.0 CRDi | 2009–2015 | 6-speed manual | 136 PS (100 kW; 134 hp) @ 4,000 rpm | 32 kg⋅m (314 N⋅m; 231 lbf⋅ft) @ 1,800–2,500 rpm | 10.8s (FWD); 11.3s (AWD) | 182 km/h (113 mph) (FWD); 181 km/h (112 mph) (AWD) |
| R II 2.0 CRDi | 2009–2015 | 6-speed automatic | 136 PS (100 kW; 134 hp) @ 4,000 rpm | 32 kg⋅m (314 N⋅m; 231 lbf⋅ft) @ 1,800–2,500 rpm | 9.8s (AWD) | 195 km/h (121 mph) (AWD) |
| R II 2.0 CRDi | 2009–2015 | 6-speed manual | 184 PS (135 kW; 181 hp) @ 4,000 rpm | 40 kg⋅m (392 N⋅m; 289 lbf⋅ft) @ 1,800–2,500 rpm | 9.4s (FWD); 10.0s (AWD) | 195 km/h (121 mph) (FWD); 194 km/h (121 mph) (AWD) |
| R II 2.0 CRDi | 2009–2015 | 6-speed automatic | 184 PS (135 kW; 181 hp) @ 4,000 rpm | 39 kg⋅m (382 N⋅m; 282 lbf⋅ft) @ 1,800–2,500 rpm | 9.8s (AWD) | 195 km/h (121 mph) (AWD) |

=== Safety ===
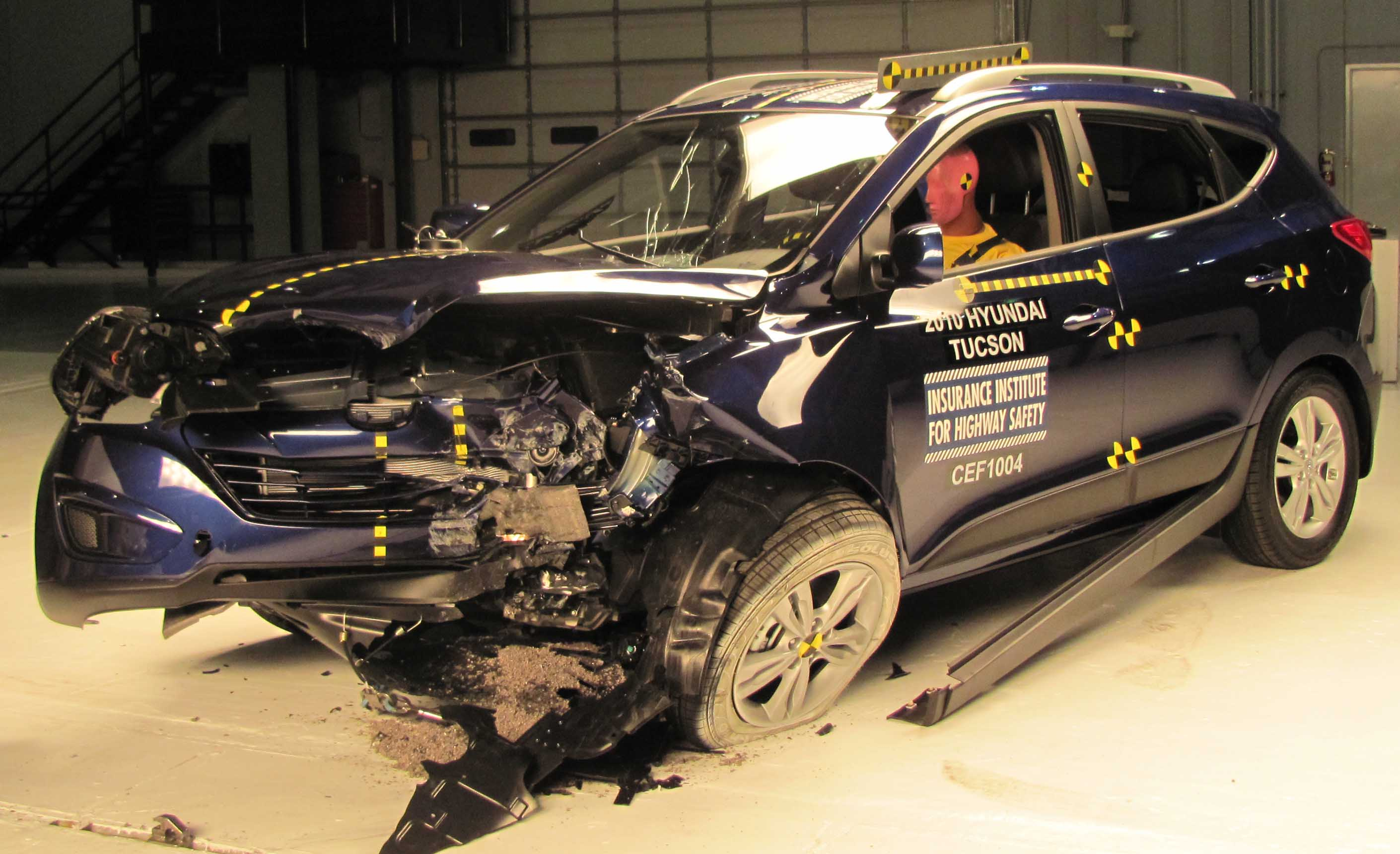
A 2010 Tucson GLS crash-tested by the Insurance Institute for Highway Safety (IIHS)

The second-generation Tucson earned 'Top Safety Pick' award in 2010 from Insurance Institute for Highway Safety (IIHS) in the U.S.

IIHS scores
| Small overlap frontal offset | Poor |
| Moderate overlap frontal offset | Good |
| Side (original test) | Good |
| Roof strength | Good |
| Head restraints and seats | Good |

ANCAP test results* Hyundai ix35 4x4 and 4x2 variants (2010)
| Test | Score |
|---|---|
| Overall | 5 /5 stars |
| Frontal offset | 15.15/16 |
| Side impact | 16/16 |
| Pole | 1/2 |
| Seat belt reminders | 2/3 |
| Whiplash protection | Not Assessed |
| Pedestrian protection | Adequate |
| Electronic stability control | Standard |

== Third generation (TL; 2015) ==
Third generation
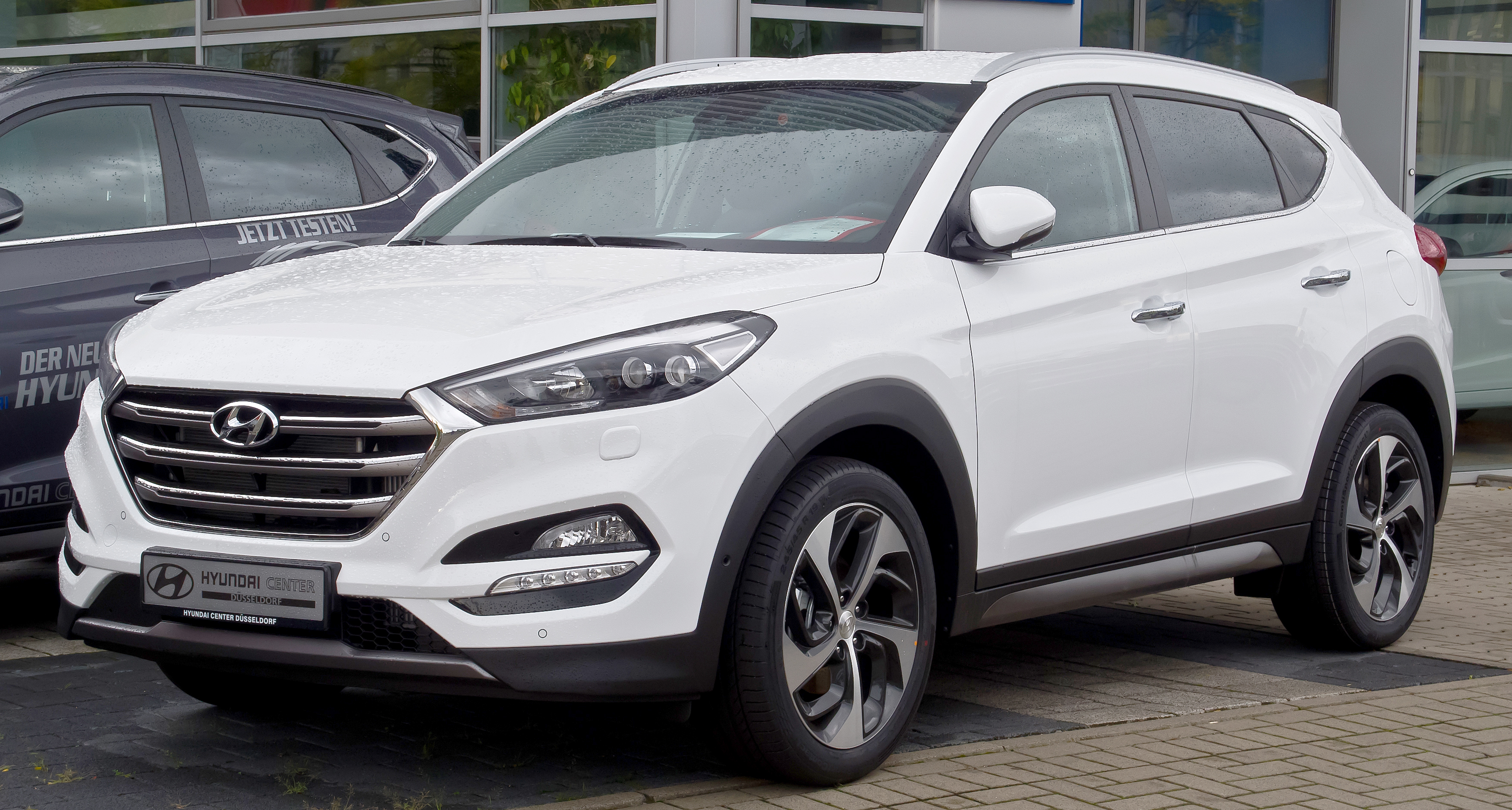
- 2015 Hyundai Tucson Premium (Germany; pre-facelift)

Overview
- Model code: TL
- Production: 2015–2021; 2017–2023 (Brazil); 2016–2022 (India); 2020–2025 (Pakistan)
- Model years: 2016–2021
- Assembly: South Korea: Ulsan; Czech Republic: Nošovice (HMMC); China: Beijing (Beijing Hyundai); Taiwan: Hukou (Sanyang Motor); Brazil: Anápolis (Hyundai Caoa); India: Chennai (HMIL); Malaysia: Kulim (Inokom); Russia: Kaliningrad (Avtotor); Vietnam: Ninh Bình (HTMV); Algeria: Tiaret (TMC); Pakistan: Faisalabad (Hyundai Nishat)
- Designer: Kim Ki-Euk; Shim Hyeon-Jung and Lee Seung-yeon (facelift)

Body and chassis
- Related: Hyundai Avante/Elantra (AD); Hyundai i30 (PD); Kia Sportage (QL)

Powertrain
- Engine: Petrol: 1.6 L Gamma GDi I4; 1.6 L Gamma T-GDi I4; 2.0 L Nu MPi I4; 2.0 L Nu GDi I4; 2.4 L Theta II MPi I4; 2.4 L Theta II GDi I4; Diesel: 1.6 L Smartstream D1.6 CRDi I4; 1.7 L U II CRDi I4; 2.0 L R II CRDi I4
- Transmission: 6-speed manual; 6-speed automatic; 7-speed DCT

Dimensions
- Wheelbase: 2,670 mm (105.1 in)
- Length: 4,475 mm (176.2 in); 4,545 mm (178.9 in) (China)
- Width: 1,850 mm (72.8 in)
- Height: 1,645 mm (64.8 in); 1,670 mm (65.7 in) (China)
- Curb weight: 1,488–1,702 kg (3,280–3,752 lb)

In February 2015, Hyundai released the first details about the third-generation Tucson ahead of the crossover's official debut at the Geneva Motor Show on 3 March 2015. This model arrived in showrooms in the second half of 2015, as a 2016 model year. Since this generation, Hyundai has discontinued the use of the ix35 nameplate, reverting to Tucson globally.

The third-generation Tucson measures 65 mm (2.6 in) longer and 30 mm (1.2 in) wider than its predecessor, while riding on a 30 mm (1.2 in) longer wheelbase. Rear storage space is also larger, with seats-up capacity growing from 465 to 513 litres.

Starting from this generation, safety technologies such as lane departure warning, blind spot detection, and auto braking for pedestrians and cars, along with a dual-clutch automatic transmission and torque vectoring known as Hyundai Active Cornering Control are offered.

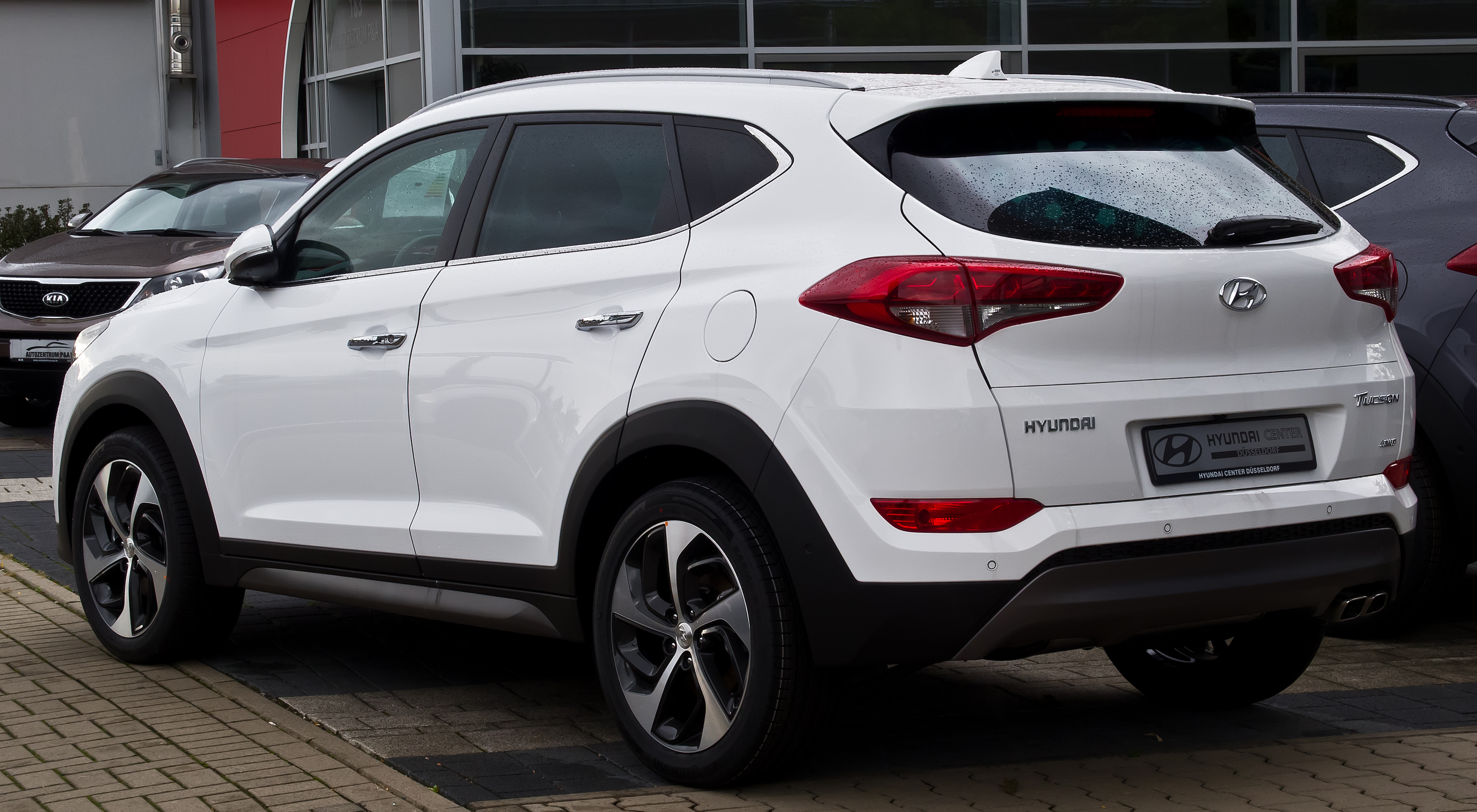
2015 Hyundai Tucson Premium (Germany; pre-facelift)

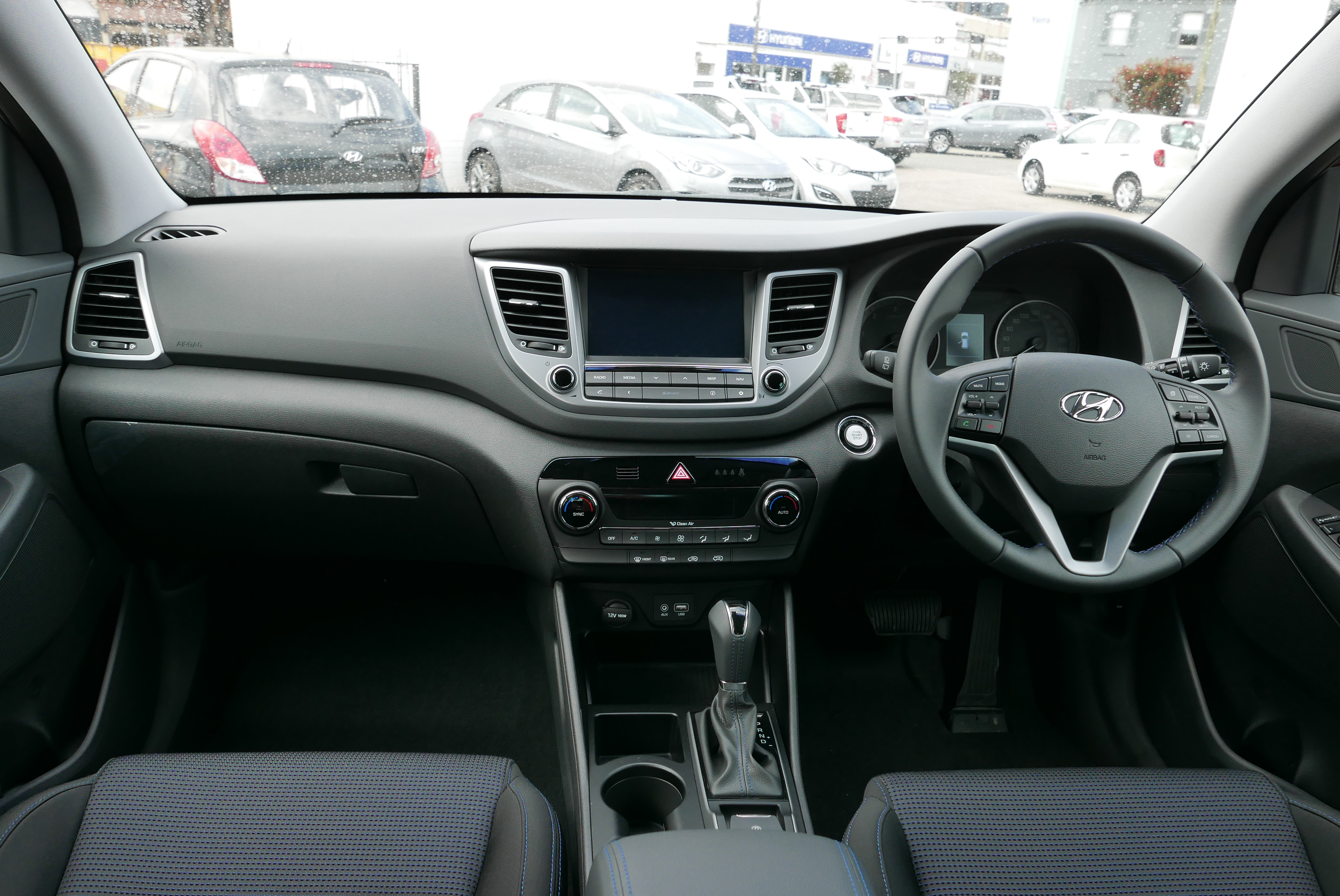
Interior (pre-facelift)

=== Markets ===
==== Australia ====
The Tucson was revealed in the country in August 2015. At launch, the Tucson was offered two petrol engines and one diesel, along with 6-speed manual, 6-speed auto and 7-speed dual-clutch auto transmissions. The 2.0-litre petrol engines include the 2.0-litre GDi Nu petrol engine, while it was also offered alongside the older 2.0-litre MPi version of the Nu engine. Other engines offered are the 1.6-litre T-GDi turbocharged petrol engine and a turbocharged 2.0-litre R-Series diesel engine. Models with the 2.0-litre GDi engine were sourced from South Korea, while the 2.0 MPi, 1.6 T-GDi and 2.0 R-Series variants were imported from the Czech Republic.

==== North America ====
Revealed in April 2015 for the 2016 model year, the North American market Tucson was offered with a choice of two engines, a 2.0-litre direct-injection four-cylinder delivering 164 hp (166 PS; 122 kW) and 151 lb⋅ft (205 N⋅m; 20.9 kg⋅m) of torque with a 6-speed automatic transmission, and a 1.6-litre turbocharged engine with 175 hp (177 PS; 130 kW) and 195 lb⋅ft (264 N⋅m; 27.0 kg⋅m) of torque paired with a 7-speed dual-clutch transmission. Both engines are available in front and all-wheel drive versions. Available in July 2015, the 2016 Hyundai Tucson was available in four trim levels: SE, Eco, Sport and Limited.

=== 2018 facelift ===
First shown at the 2018 New York International Auto Show, the Tucson for the 2019 model year received a facelift and changes to the powertrain options. Exterior updates included a new cascade grille, reshaped hood and tailgate design, rectangular fuel door, new rim designs, and an updated LED headlight design for higher trim levels. The interior received an update to include a newly designed dash with lower centrally placed air vents and a high-mounted head unit display.

In North America, the Driver Attention Warning (DAW) system was standard across all trim levels, and both the Lane Keeping Assist (LKA) departure/correction system and Front Collision Avoidance Assist (FCA) system were now also standard across all trim levels. The manual and dual clutch transmission options were dropped in favor of the 6-speed Shiftronic automatic used in the previous model. The 2.0-litre Nu GDi engine continues in the SE and Value trim levels but for other trims the 1.6-litre I4 turbocharged engine was dropped and replaced by a 2.4-litre I4 GDi naturally aspirated engine which produces 181 hp (184 PS; 135 kW) at 6,000 rpm and 175 lb⋅ft (237 N⋅m; 24.2 kg⋅m) with a slight loss in fuel economy.

In early 2019, Hyundai started selling the N-Line variant, mainly in the European market.

In August 2020, Hyundai Nishat commenced the local assembly of the facelifted model in Pakistan. Initially, it came in only two trim levels, the FWD GLS Sport and the AWD Ultimate. Later on, a third trim level, the FWD GLS, was also launched. All three trim levels come with the 2.0 L Nu MPi I4 engine full LED Headlamps and 6-speed automatic transmission.

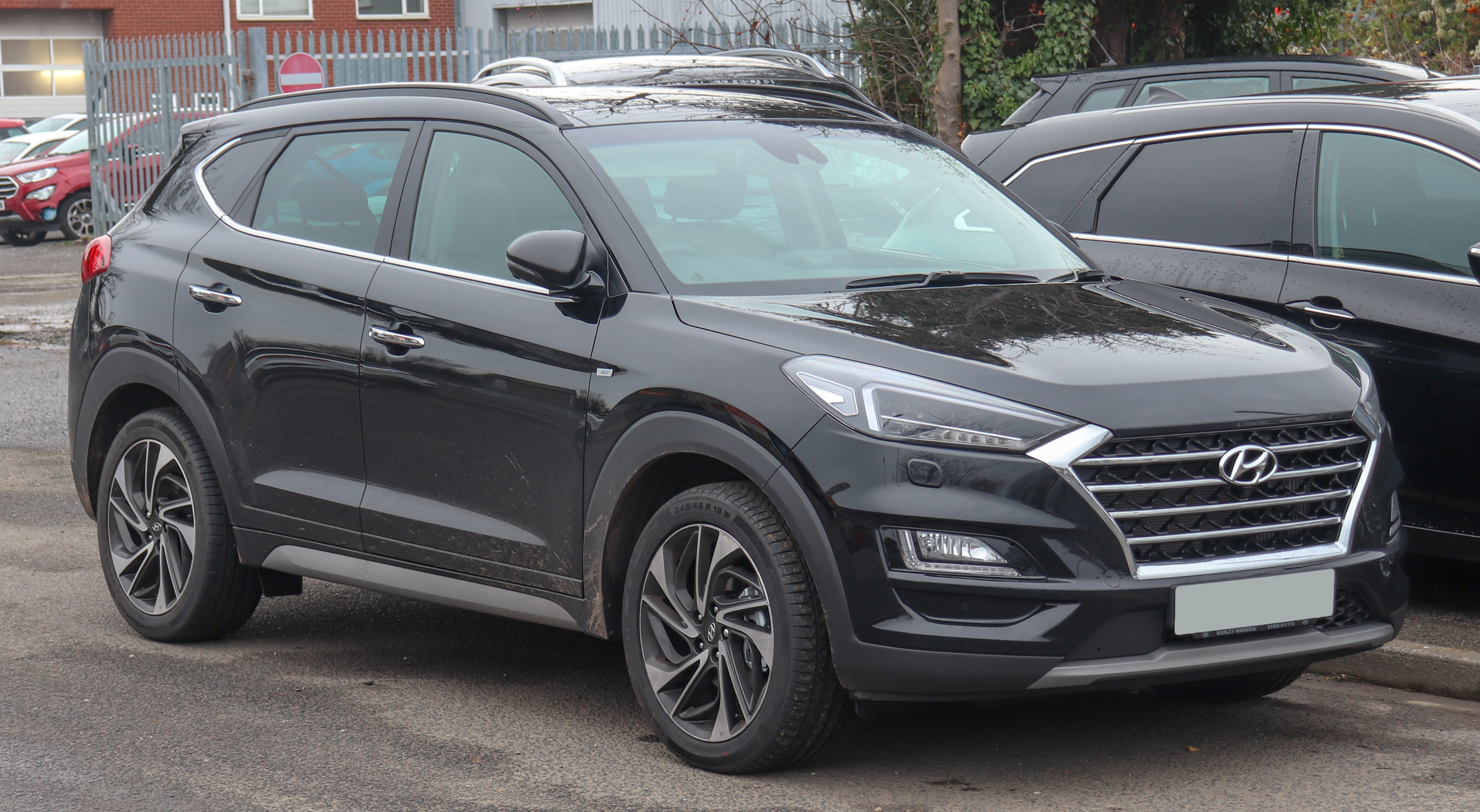
2018 Hyundai Tucson Premium SE (UK; facelift)

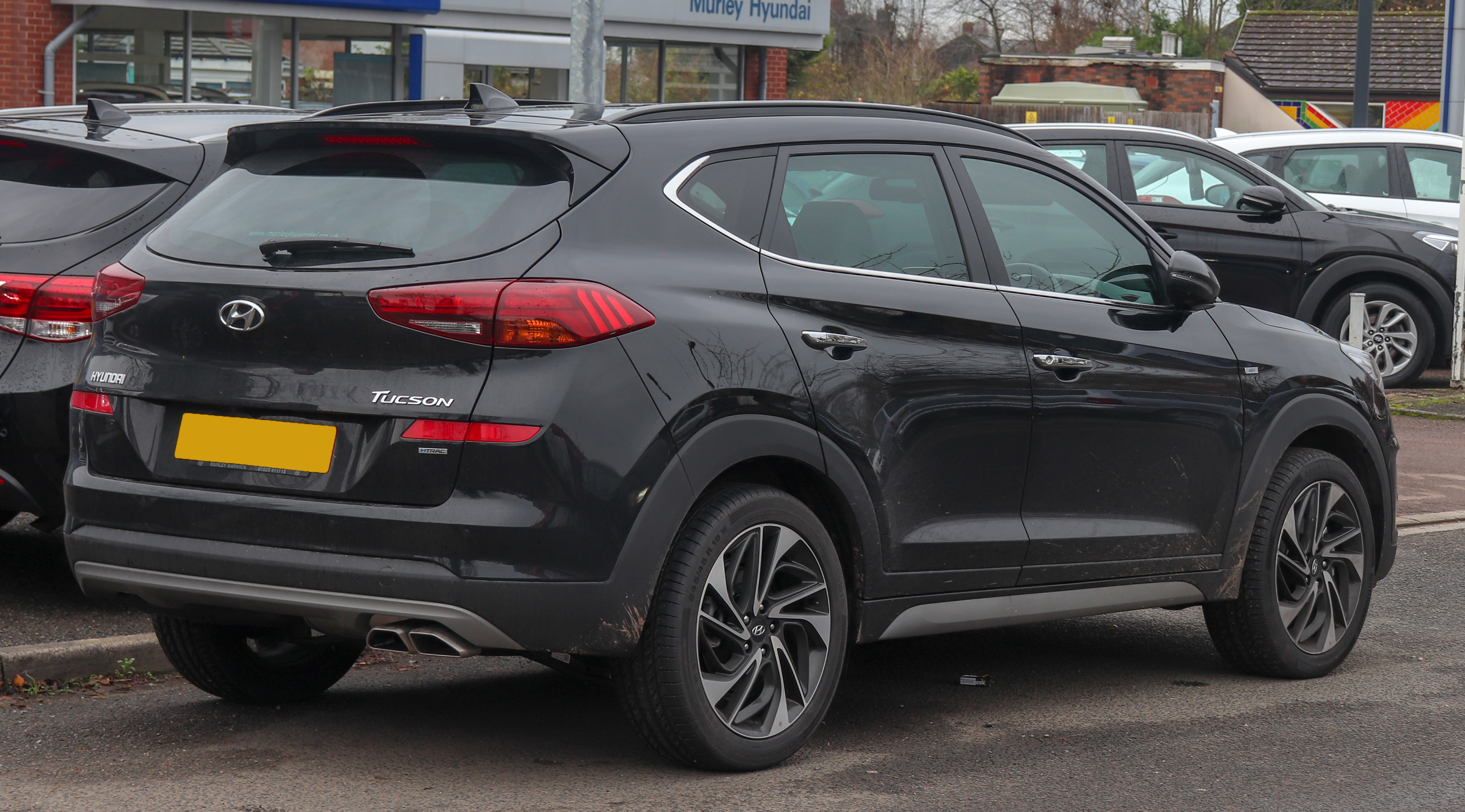
2018 Hyundai Tucson Premium SE (UK; facelift)

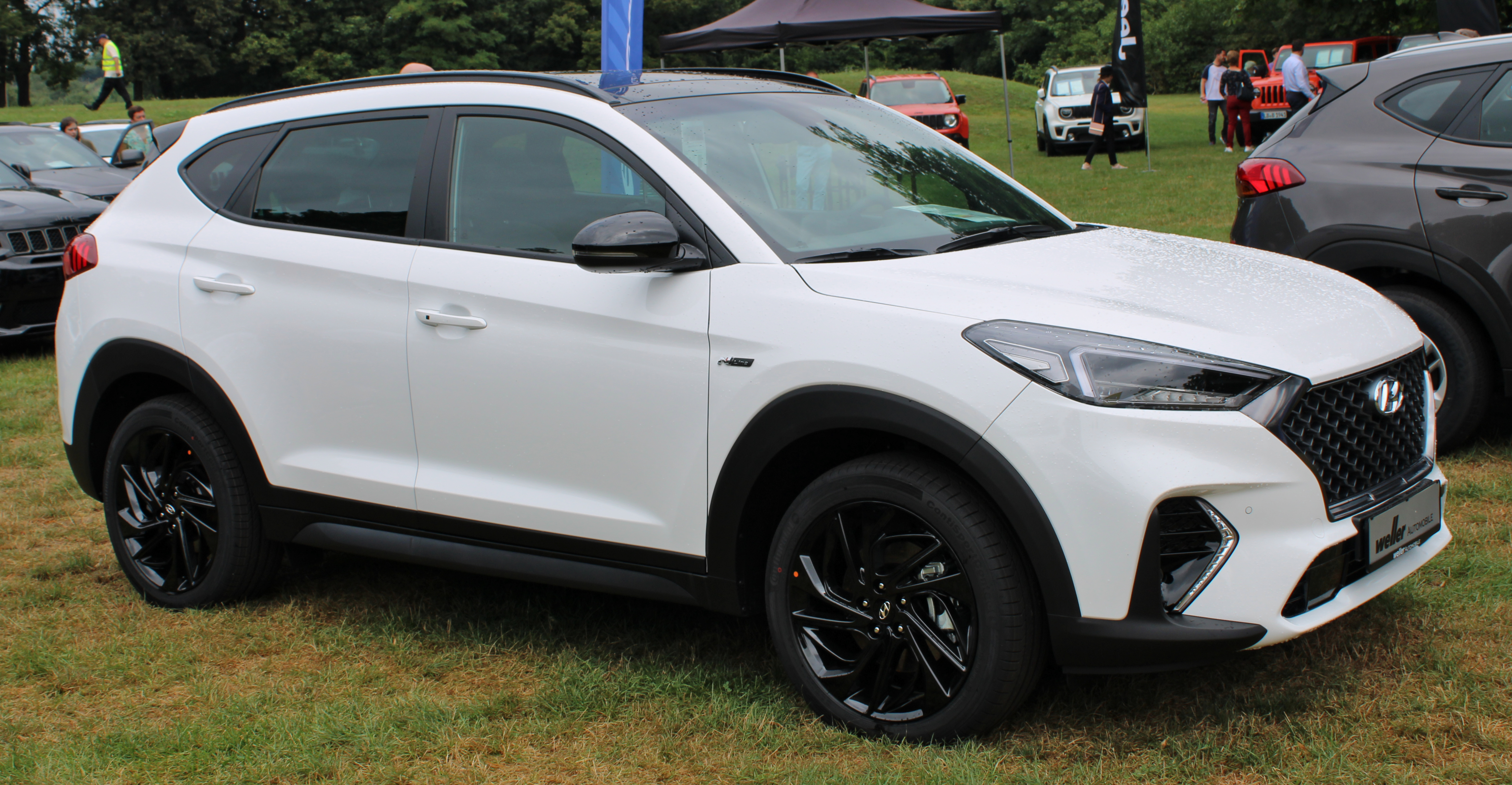
2019 Hyundai Tucson N-Line (Germany; facelift)

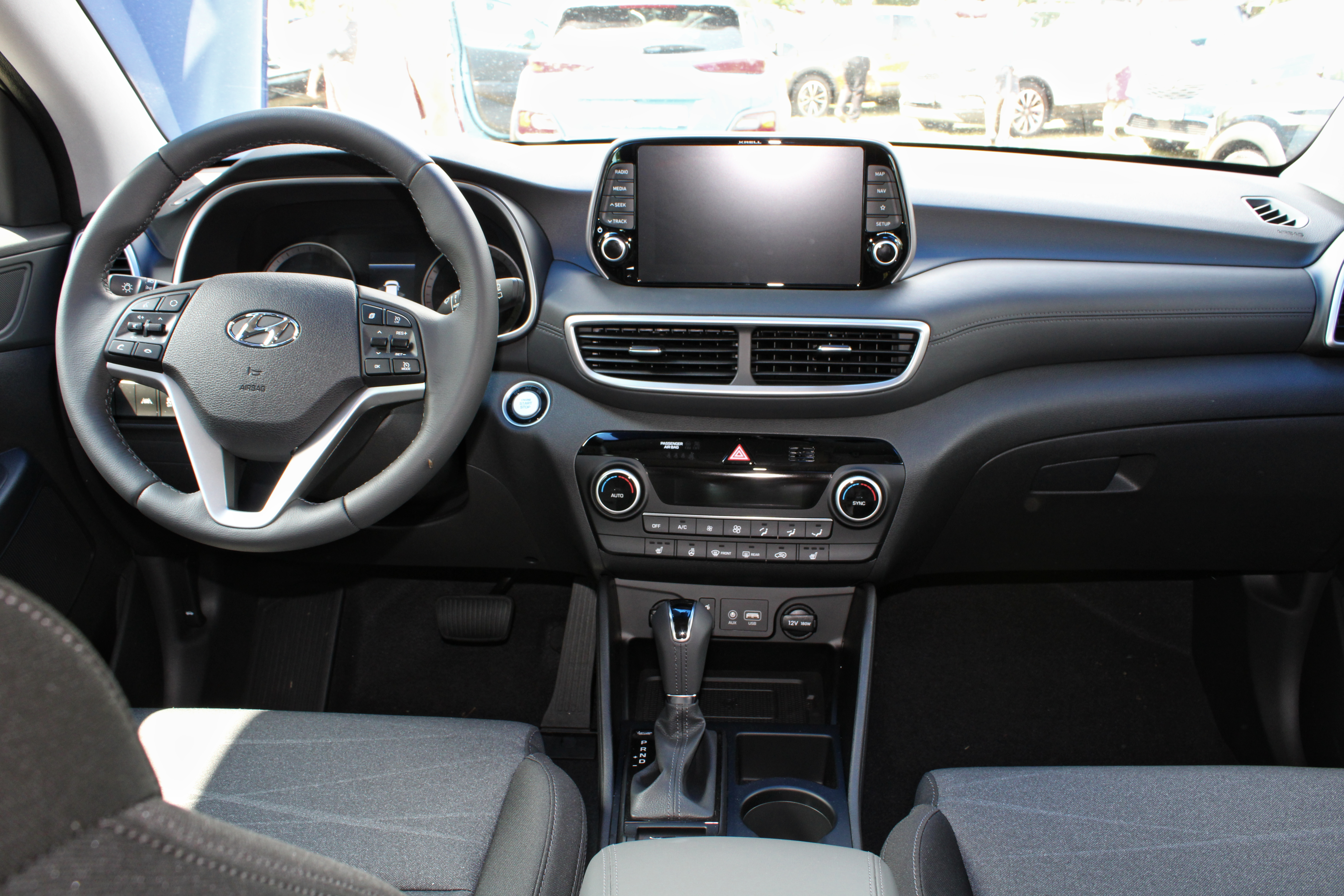
Interior (facelift)

=== 2019 Chinese market facelift ===
For the Chinese market, the Tucson was given an alternate facelift for the 2019 model year with the single model name known as 280TGDi and 6 separate trim levels. The 1.6-litre G4FJ engine is available paired to a 7-speed dual-clutch transmission.

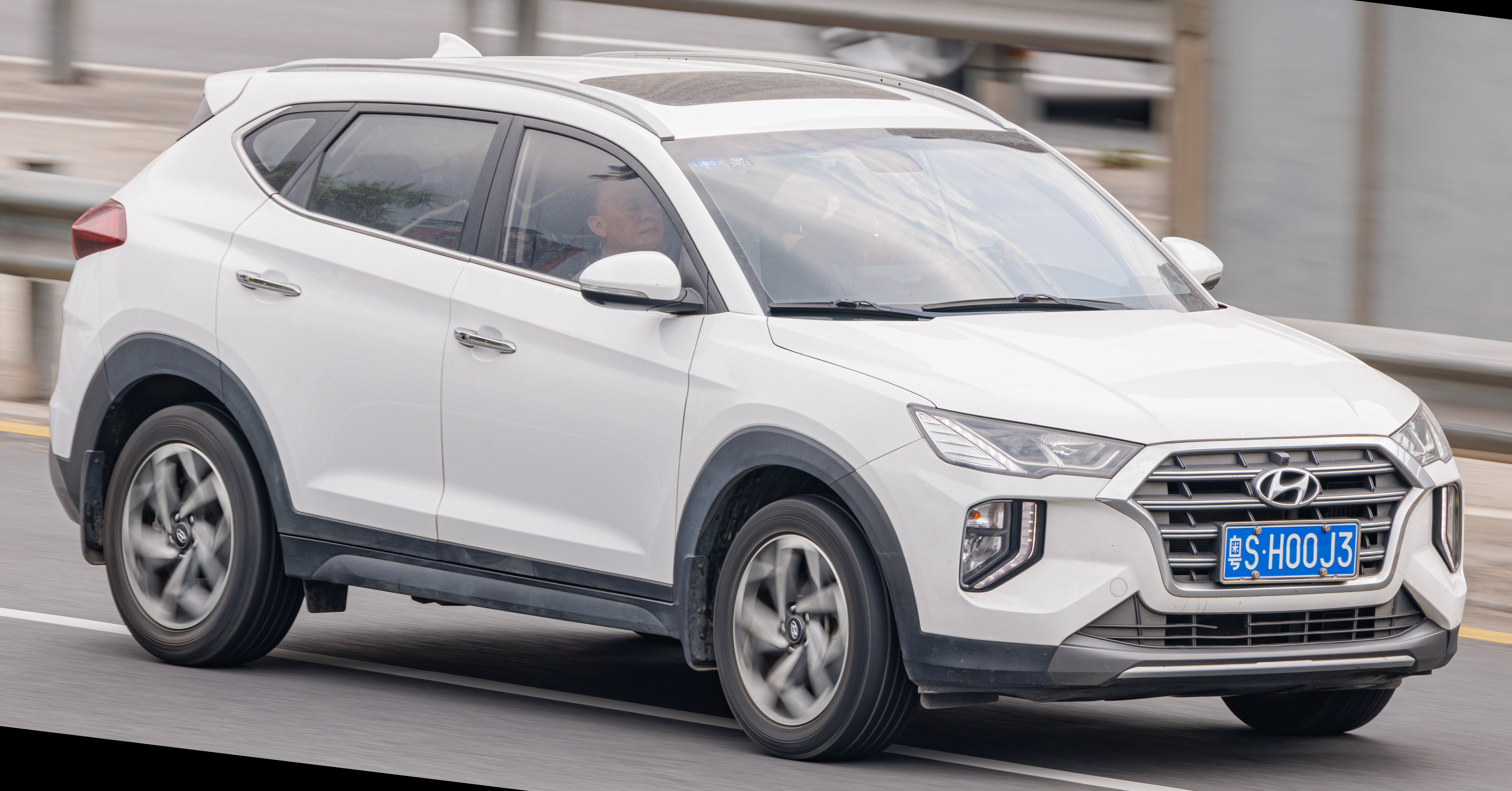
First facelift (Chinese market)

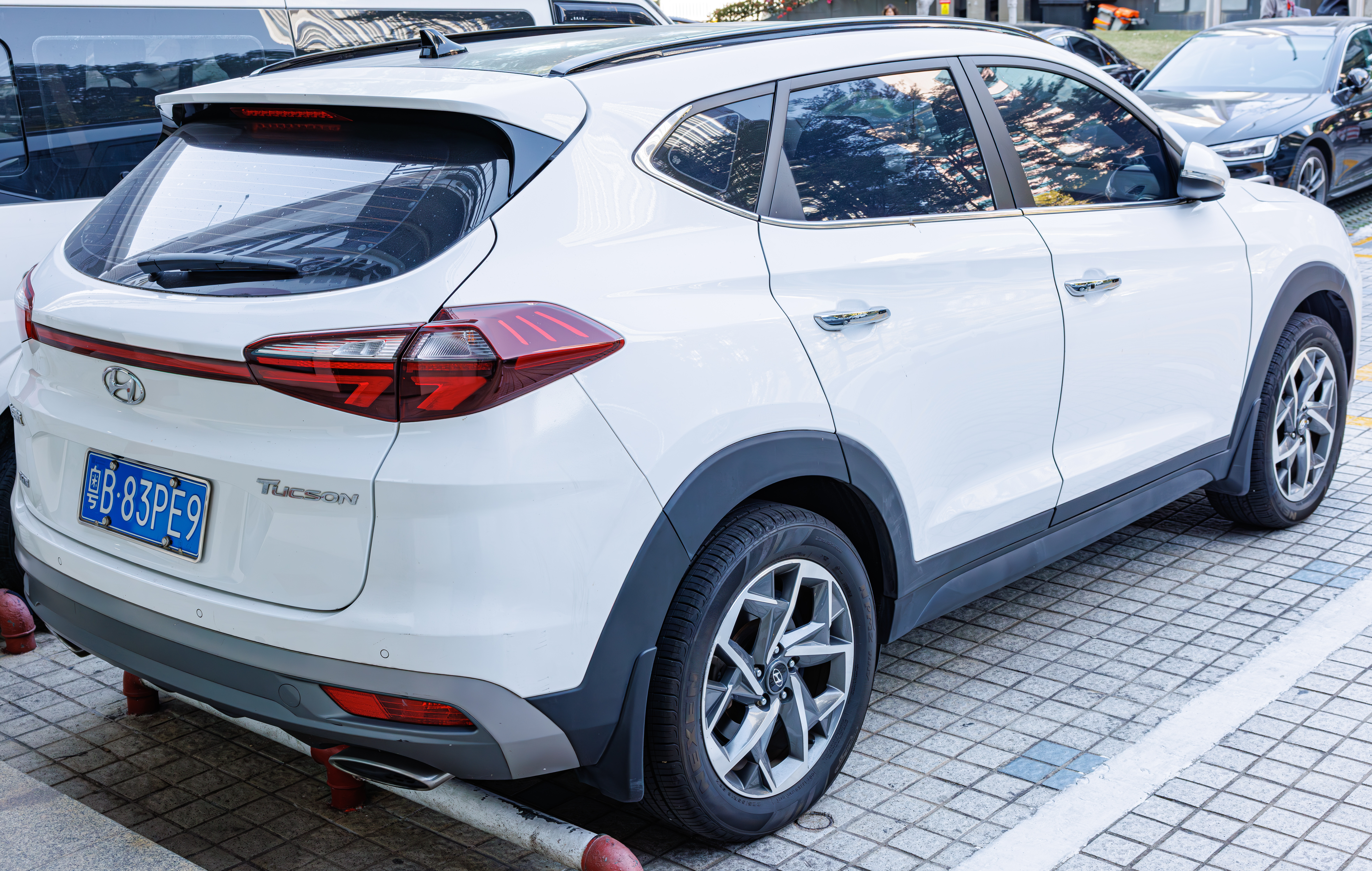
First facelift (Chinese market)

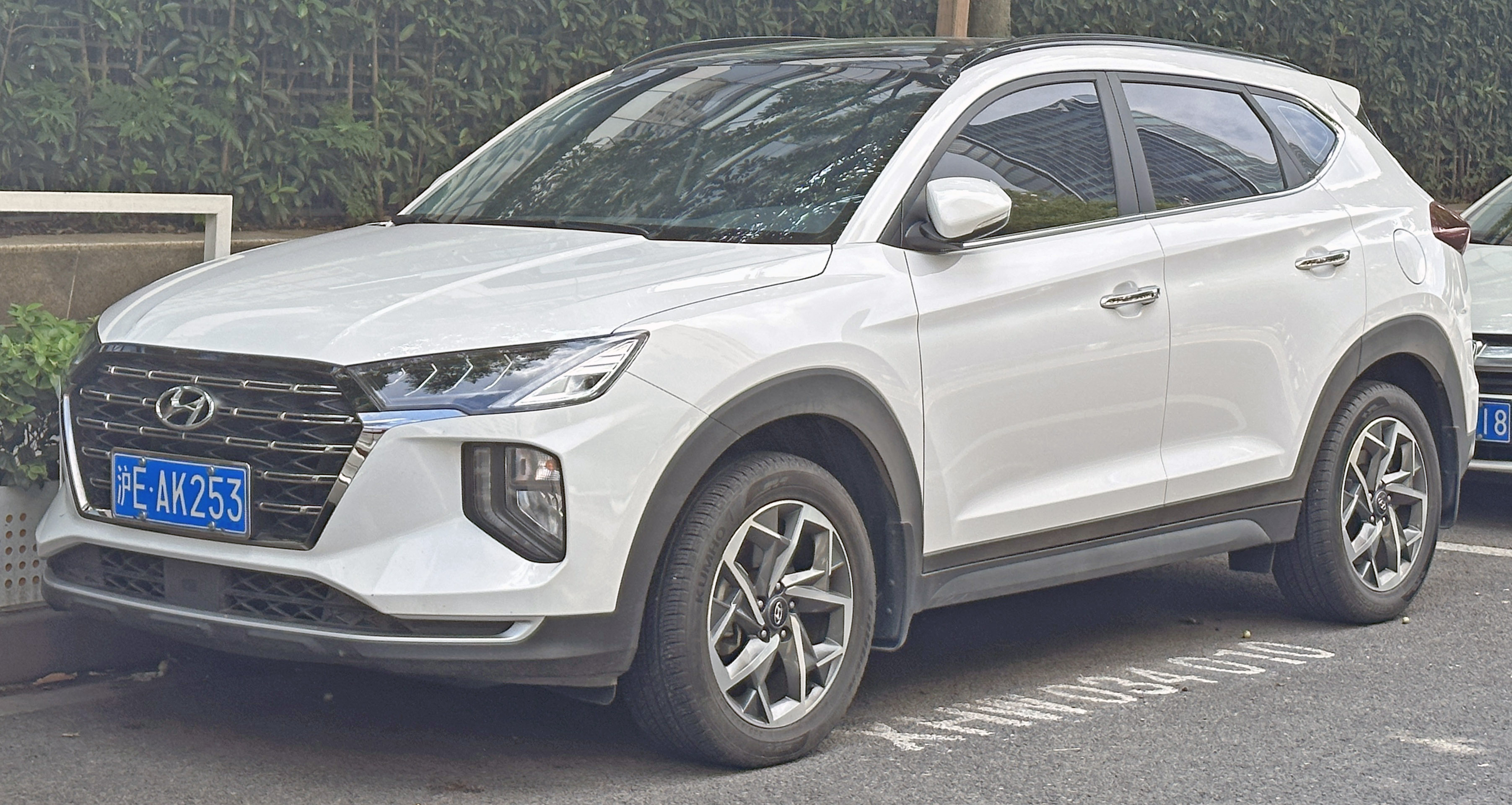
Second facelift (Chinese market)

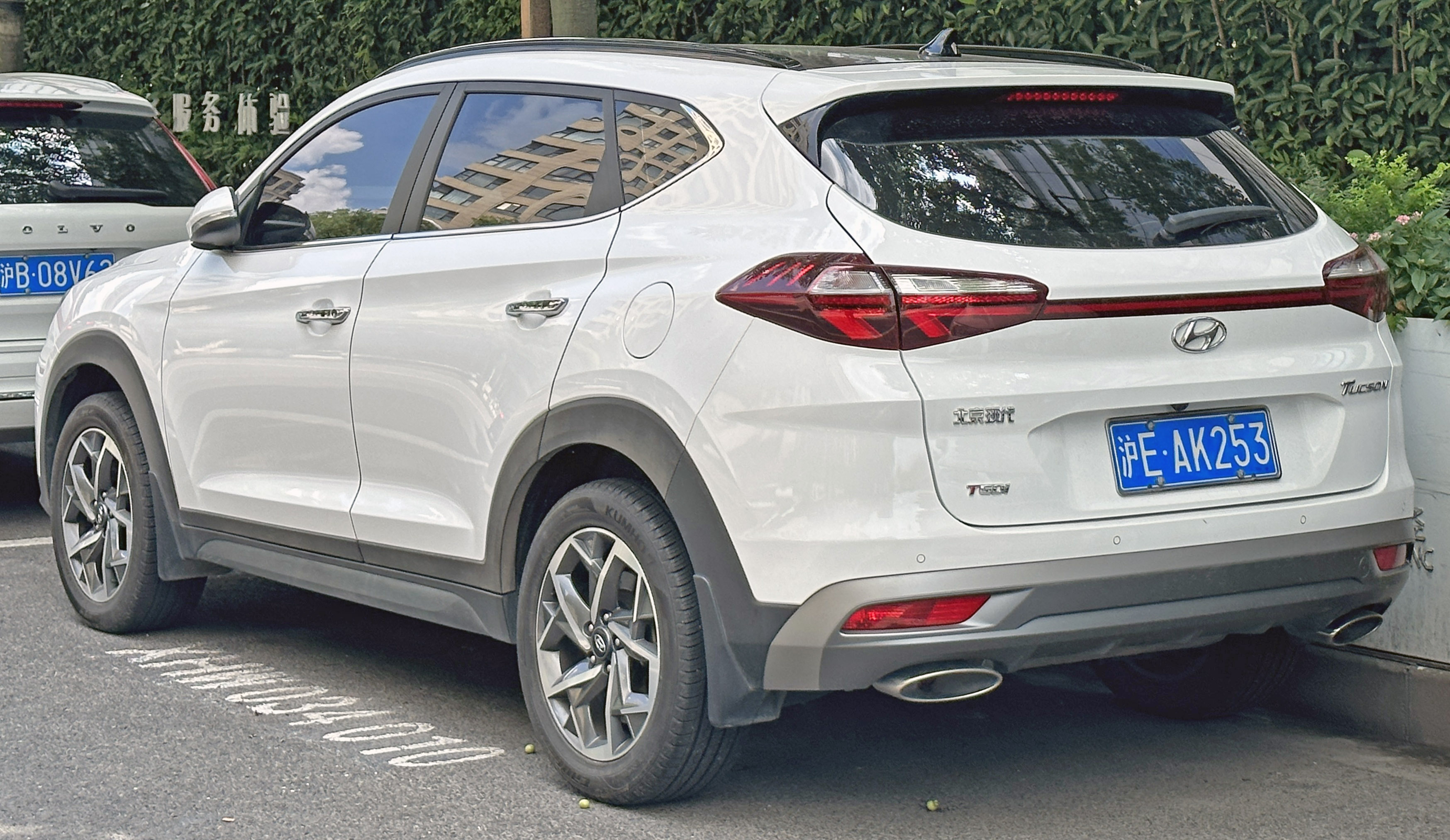
Second facelift (Chinese market)

=== Powertrain ===
During the Geneva Motor Show, Hyundai also unveiled two concept variants, a Tucson hybrid electric and a diesel-powered plug-in hybrid. The 48V Hybrid combines a 2.0-litre diesel model with 134 hp (100 kW) and a six-speed manual transmission along with a 14 hp (10 kW) electric motor; combined system performance is 148 hp (110 kW) and 413 N·m (305 lb-ft) of torque. This increases system power by 10% while emitting only 109 g/km CO_{2}. The concept plug-in-hybrid is also based on the all-new Tucson platform and is equipped with a 1.7-litre diesel engine and a seven-speed dual-clutch transmission. The engine generates 113 hp (85 kW) and is accompanied by a 67 hp (50 kW) electric motor and a 10.7 kWh lithium-ion polymer battery, which delivers an all-electric range of more than 50 km (31 mi). Combined system output is a maximum of 180 hp (135 kW) with 474 N·m (350 lb-ft) of torque, with estimated CO_{2} emissions of less than 48 g/km.

Specs
| Model | Years | Transmission | Power | Torque | 0–100 km/h (0–62 mph) (official) | Top speed |
Petrol
| Gamma II 1.6 GDi | 2015–2020 | 6-speed manual | 132 PS (97 kW; 130 hp) @ 6,300 rpm | 16.4 kg⋅m (161 N⋅m; 119 lbf⋅ft) @ 4,850 rpm | 11.5s | 182 km/h (113 mph) |
| Gamma II 1.6 GDi | 2015–2020 | 6-speed automatic | 132 PS (97 kW; 130 hp) @ 6,300 rpm | 16.4 kg⋅m (161 N⋅m; 119 lbf⋅ft) @ 4,850 rpm | 12.1s | 170 km/h (106 mph) |
| Gamma II 1.6 T-GDi | 2015–2020 | 6-speed manual | 177 PS (130 kW; 175 hp) @ 5,500 rpm | 27 kg⋅m (265 N⋅m; 195 lbf⋅ft) @ 1,500–4,500 rpm | 9.2s (FWD); 9.5s (AWD) | 205 km/h (127 mph) (FWD); 201 km/h (125 mph) (AWD) |
| Gamma II 1.6 T-GDi | 2015–2020 | 7-speed dual clutch automatic | 177 PS (130 kW; 175 hp) @ 5,500 rpm | 27 kg⋅m (265 N⋅m; 195 lbf⋅ft) @ 1,500–4,500 rpm | 8.9s (FWD); 9.1s (AWD) | 203 km/h (126 mph) (FWD); 200 km/h (124 mph) (AWD) |
| Nu 2.0 MPi | 2015–2020 | 6-speed manual | 155 PS (114 kW; 153 hp) @ 6,200 rpm | 19.6 kg⋅m (192 N⋅m; 142 lbf⋅ft) @ 4,000 rpm | 10.6s (FWD); 11.3s (AWD) | 186 km/h (116 mph) (FWD); 184 km/h (114 mph) (AWD) |
| Nu 2.0 MPi | 2015–2020 | 6-speed automatic | 155 PS (114 kW; 153 hp) @ 6,200 rpm | 19.6 kg⋅m (192 N⋅m; 142 lbf⋅ft) @ 4,000 rpm | 11.1s (FWD); 11.8s (AWD) | 181 km/h (112 mph) (FWD); 180 km/h (112 mph) (AWD) |
| Nu 2.0 GDi | 2015–2020 | 6-speed automatic | 163 PS (120 kW; 161 hp) @ 6,200 rpm | 20.8 kg⋅m (204 N⋅m; 150 lbf⋅ft) @ 4,500 rpm | | |
| Theta II 2.4 MPi | 2015–2020 | 6-speed manual | 176 PS (129 kW; 174 hp) @ 6,000 rpm | 23.2 kg⋅m (228 N⋅m; 168 lbf⋅ft) @ 4,000 rpm | | |
| Theta II 2.4 MPi | 2015–2020 | 6-speed automatic | 176 PS (129 kW; 174 hp) @ 6,000 rpm | 23.2 kg⋅m (228 N⋅m; 168 lbf⋅ft) @ 4,000 rpm | | |
| Theta II 2.4 GDi | 2015–2020 | 6-speed automatic | 184 PS (135 kW; 181 hp) @ 6,000 rpm | 24.2 kg⋅m (237 N⋅m; 175 lbf⋅ft) @ 4,000 rpm | 9.6s | 192 km/h (119 mph) |
Diesel
| 1.6 Smartstream D1.6 CRDi | 2018–2020 | 6-speed manual | 115 PS (85 kW; 113 hp) @ 4,000 rpm | 28.6 kg⋅m (280 N⋅m; 207 lbf⋅ft) @ 1,500–2,750 rpm | 11.8s | 175 km/h (109 mph) |
| 1.6 Smartstream D1.6 CRDi | 2018–2020 | 6-speed manual | 136 PS (100 kW; 134 hp) @ 4,000 rpm | 32.6 kg⋅m (320 N⋅m; 236 lbf⋅ft) @ 2,000–2,250 rpm | 11.2s | 180 km/h (112 mph) |
| 1.6 Smartstream D1.6 CRDi | 2018–2020 | 7-speed dual clutch automatic | 136 PS (100 kW; 134 hp) @ 4,000 rpm | 32.6 kg⋅m (320 N⋅m; 236 lbf⋅ft) @ 2,000–2,250 rpm | 11.8s | 180 km/h (112 mph) |
| 1.7 U II CRDi | 2015–2018 | 6-speed manual | 116 PS (85 kW; 114 hp) @ 4,000 rpm | 28.6 kg⋅m (280 N⋅m; 207 lbf⋅ft) @ 1,250–2,750 rpm | 13.7s | 176 km/h (109 mph) |
| 1.7 U II CRDi | 2015–2018 | 7-speed dual clutch automatic | 141 PS (104 kW; 139 hp) @ 4,000 rpm | 34.7 kg⋅m (340 N⋅m; 251 lbf⋅ft) @ 1,750–2,500 rpm | 10.6s | 186 km/h (116 mph) |
| 2.0 R II CRDi | 2015–2018 | 6-speed manual | 136 PS (100 kW; 134 hp) @ 2,750–4,000 rpm | 38 kg⋅m (373 N⋅m; 275 lbf⋅ft) @ 1,500–2,500 rpm | 10.6s | 187 km/h (116 mph) |
| 2.0 R II CRDi | 2018–2020 | 6-speed manual | 185 PS (136 kW; 182 hp) @ 4,000 rpm | 40.8 kg⋅m (400 N⋅m; 295 lbf⋅ft) @ 1,750–2,750 rpm | 9.9s | 201 km/h (125 mph) |
| 2.0 R II CRDi | 2018–2020 | 8-speed automatic | 185 PS (136 kW; 182 hp) @ 4,000 rpm | 40.8 kg⋅m (400 N⋅m; 295 lbf⋅ft) @ 1,750–2,750 rpm | 9.5s | 201 km/h (125 mph) |

=== Safety ===
| Euro NCAP (2015) | | IIHS (2016) | | | Latin NCAP 3.0 (2021) | |
|---|---|---|---|---|---|---|
| Overall | 5/5 stars | Small overlap front (driver) | Good | | Overall | 0/5 stars |
| Adult occupant | 86% | Small overlap front (passenger) | Good | | Adult occupant | 51% |
| Child occupant | 85% | Moderate overlap front | Good | | Child occupant | 4% |
| Pedestrian | 71% | Side (original) | Good | | Pedestrian and vulnerable road users | 50% |
| Safety assist | 71% | Side (updated) | Marginal | | Safety assist systems | 7% |
| | | Roof strength | Good | | | |
| | | Head restraints and seats | Good | | | |
| | | Headlights (varies by trim/option) | Acceptable | Poor | | |
| | | Front crash prevention (vehicle-to-vehicle) | Superior | | | |
| | | Child seat anchors (LATCH) ease of use | Acceptable | Marginal | | |

ANCAP test results* Hyundai Tucson 2.0L GDi petrol 2WD variants (2015)
| Test | Score |
|---|---|
| Overall | 4 /5 stars |
| Frontal offset | 11.46/16 |
| Side impact | 16/16 |
| Pole | 2/2 |
| Seat belt reminders | 3/3 |
| Whiplash protection | Good |
| Pedestrian protection | Marginal |
| Electronic stability control | Standard |

ANCAP test results* Hyundai Tucson all variants (2015)
| Test | Score |
|---|---|
| Overall | 5 /5 stars |
| Frontal offset | 14.53/16 |
| Side impact | 16/16 |
| Pole | 2/2 |
| Seat belt reminders | 3/3 |
| Whiplash protection | Good |
| Pedestrian protection | Marginal |
| Electronic stability control | Standard |

== Fourth generation (NX4; 2020) ==
Fourth generation
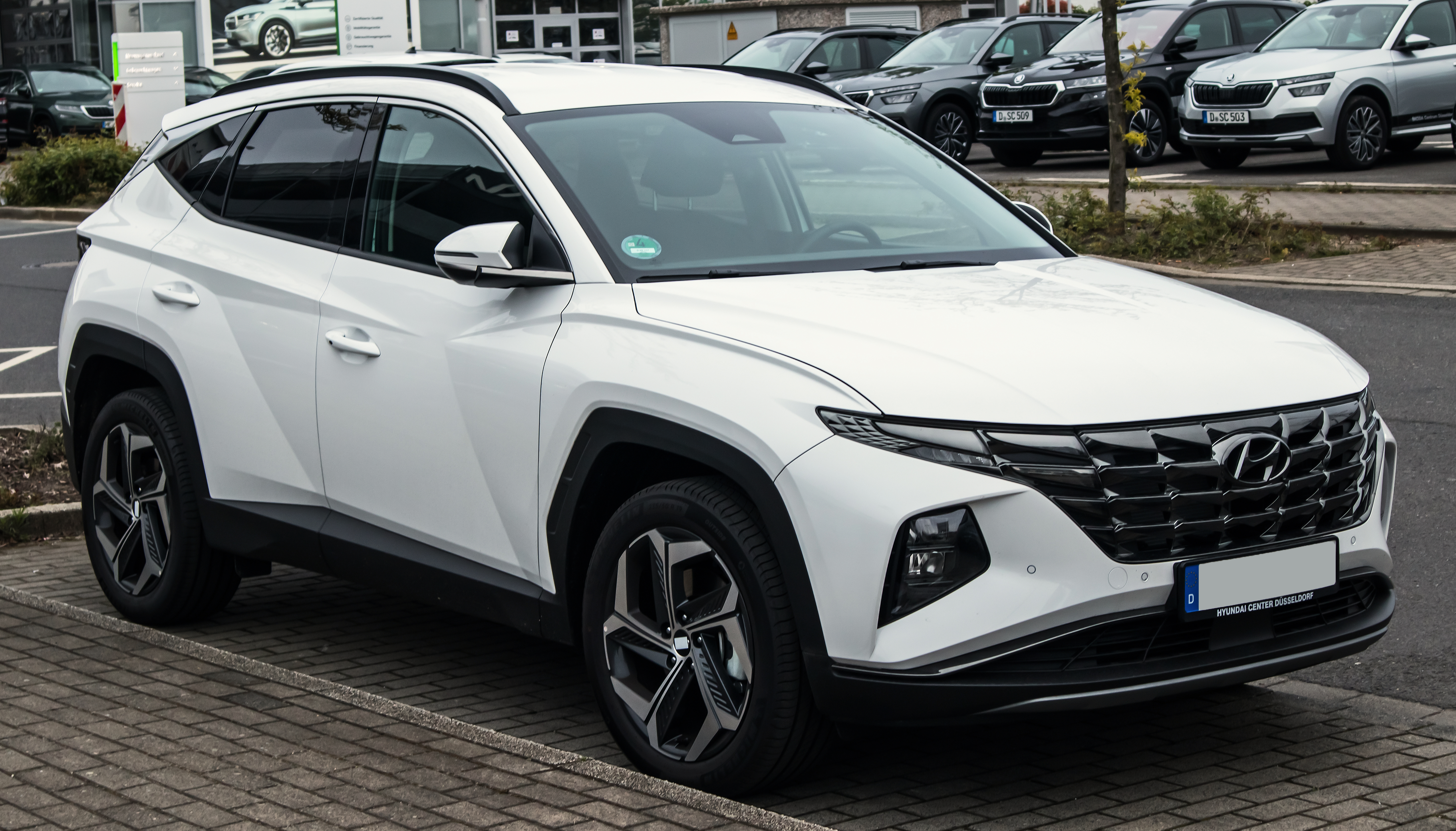
- 2024 Tucson Prime Hybrid (pre-facelift)

Overview
- Model code: NX4
- Also called: Hyundai Tucson L (LWB, China and Taiwan)
- Production: 2020–present 2022–2025 (India); 2024–present (Mexico); 2025–present (Pakistan)
- Model years: 2022–2026
- Assembly: South Korea: Ulsan (Ulsan Plant 3, 5); Czechia: Nošovice (HMMC); United States: Montgomery, Alabama (HMMA); Mexico: Pesquería (KMMX); China: Beijing (Beijing Hyundai); Taiwan: Hukou (Sanyang Motor); Vietnam: Ninh Bình (HTMV); India: Chennai (HMIL); Pakistan: Faisalabad (Hyundai Nishat)
- Designer: Kim Jun-Ho; Hong In-Soo (N-Line)

Body and chassis
- Platform: Hyundai-Kia N3/N4
- Related: Hyundai Santa Cruz; Hyundai Mufasa; Kia Sportage (NQ5)

Powertrain
- Engine: Petrol: 1.5 L Smartstream G1.5 T-GDi I4; 1.6 L Smartstream G1.6 T-GDi I4; 2.0 L Smartstream G2.0 MPi I4; 2.5 L Smartstream G2.5 GDi I4; Petrol hybrid: 1.6 L Smartstream G1.6T HEV T-GDi I4; 2.0 L Smartstream G2.0 HEV GDi I4; Petrol plug-in hybrid: 1.6 L Smartstream G1.6T PHEV T-GDi I4; Diesel: 1.6 L Smartstream D1.6 CRDi I4; 2.0 L Smartstream D2.0 CRDi I4
- Electric motor: Permanent magnet synchronous (hybrid and PHEV)
- Transmission: 6-speed M6CF3 manual; 6-speed M6CF3 clutchless manual; 6-speed automatic; 8-speed automatic; 6-speed D6KF1 DCT; 7-speed D7UF1 DCT
- Hybrid drivetrain: 48 V mild hybrid (MHEV); Parallel hybrid (HEV); Plug-in hybrid (PHEV)
- Battery: 1.49 kWh lithium-ion (HEV); 13.8 kWh lithium-ion (PHEV)

Dimensions
- Wheelbase: 2,680 mm (105.5 in) (SWB); 2,755 mm (108.5 in) (LWB)
- Length: 4,500–4,510 mm (177.2–177.6 in) (SWB); 4,630–4,670 mm (182.3–183.9 in) (LWB)
- Width: 1,865 mm (73.4 in)
- Height: 1,650–1,690 mm (65.0–66.5 in)
- Curb weight: 1,491–1,700 kg (3,287–3,748 lb)

The fourth-generation Tucson was revealed on 15 September 2020. The all-new model features Hyundai's "jewel-like" grille, with geometric daytime running lights integrated in its design. Hyundai's design team, led by SangYup Lee, its senior vice president and head of Hyundai Global Design Center, has reshaped the Tucson with bulging fenders, angled wheel wells, a level roofline and short overhangs. Prior to its release, the fourth-generation Tucson was previewed as the Vision T Concept showcased at the 2019 Los Angeles Auto Show in November 2019.

Riding on a shortened version of the N3 platform shared with the larger Santa Fe, the fourth-generation Tucson is offered with two wheelbase length for different markets to meet different customers needs and expectations in different regions, which are short-wheelbase (2,680 mm (105.5 in)), and long-wheelbase (2,755 mm (108.5 in)). Most regions outside Europe, Middle East and Mexico receives the long-wheelbase version. In China, the long-wheelbase-only fourth-generation Tucson is marketed as the Tucson L to differentiate itself with the older model.

In the interior, the new Tucson features an optional hoodless fully digital instrument cluster and a four-spoke steering wheel. It also includes a vertically stacked, dual 10.25 in (260 mm) full-touch screen with capacitive buttons. For the long-wheelbase version, Hyundai claimed the cargo volume will provide a 38.7 cu ft (1,096 L) of usable space.

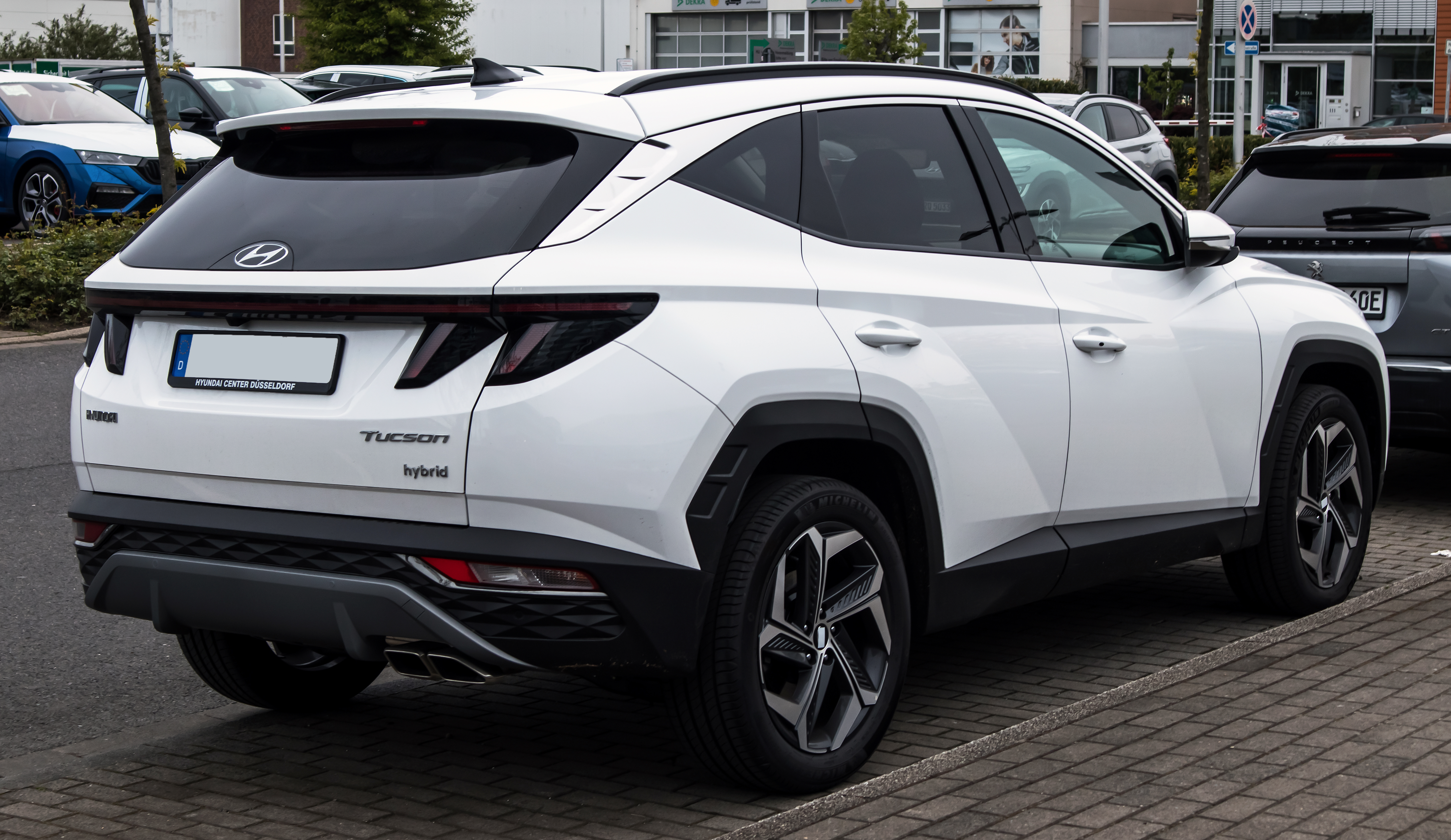
Rear view (SWB; pre-facelift)

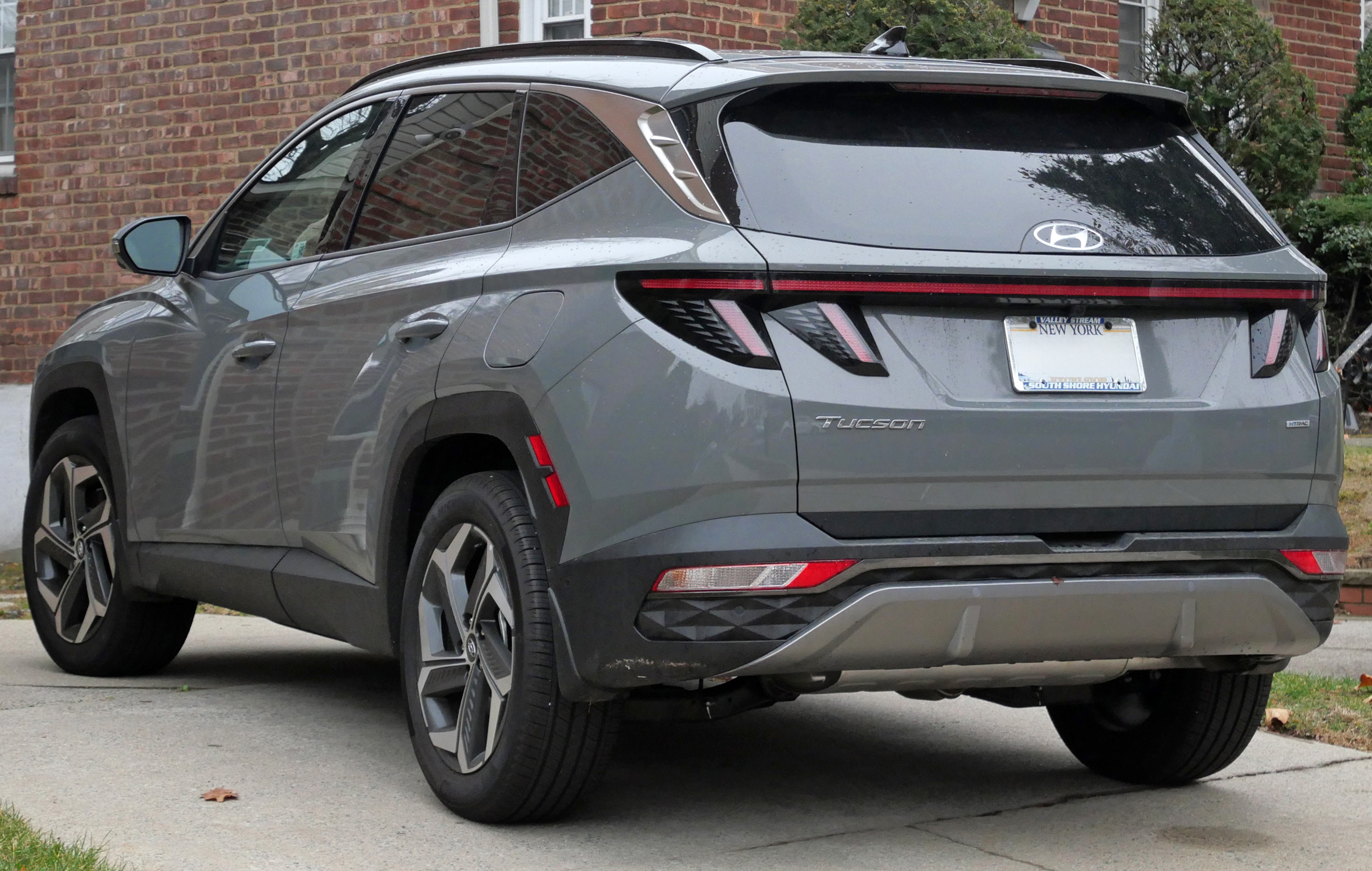
Rear view (LWB; pre-facelift)

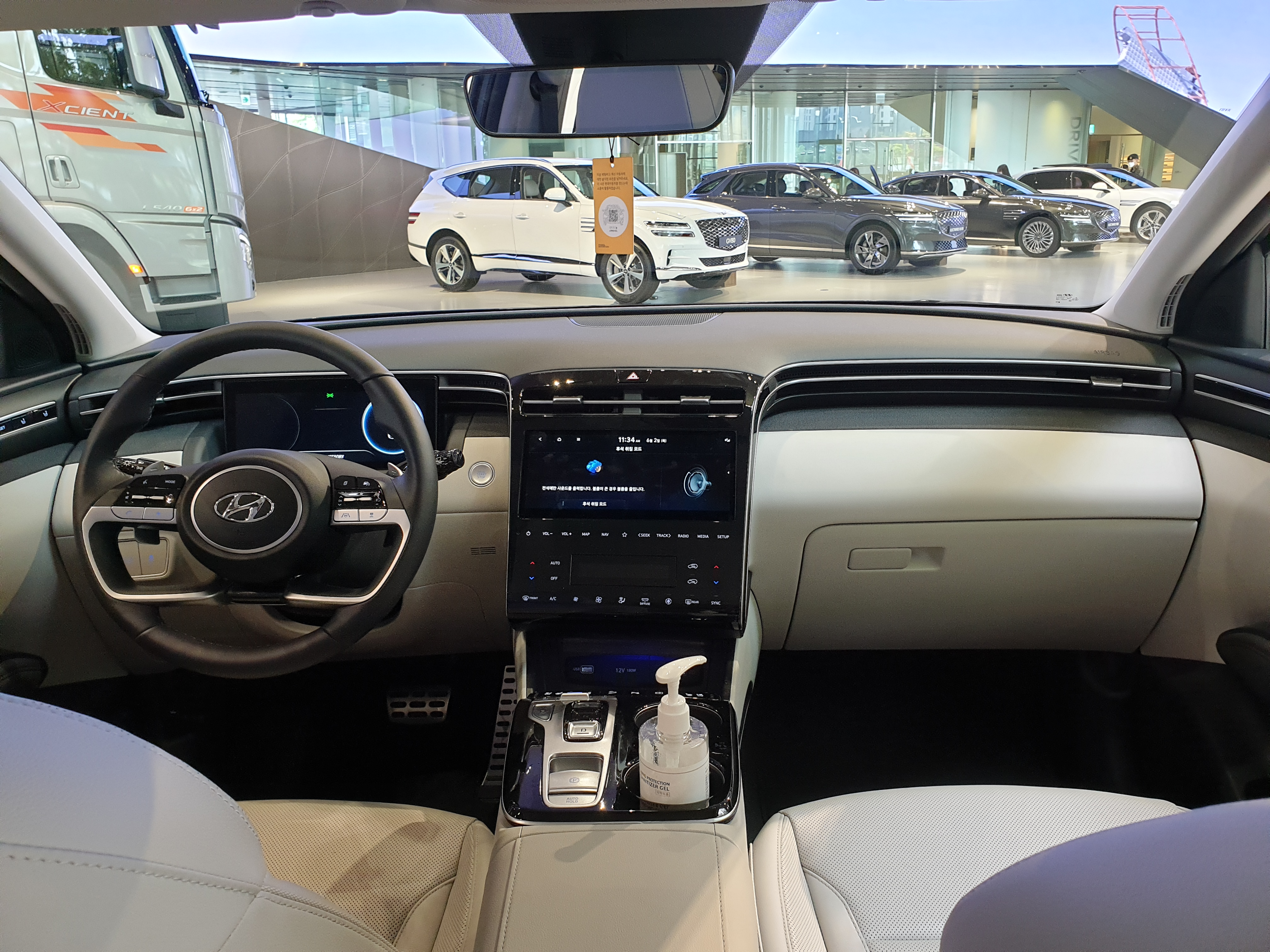
Interior (pre-facelift)

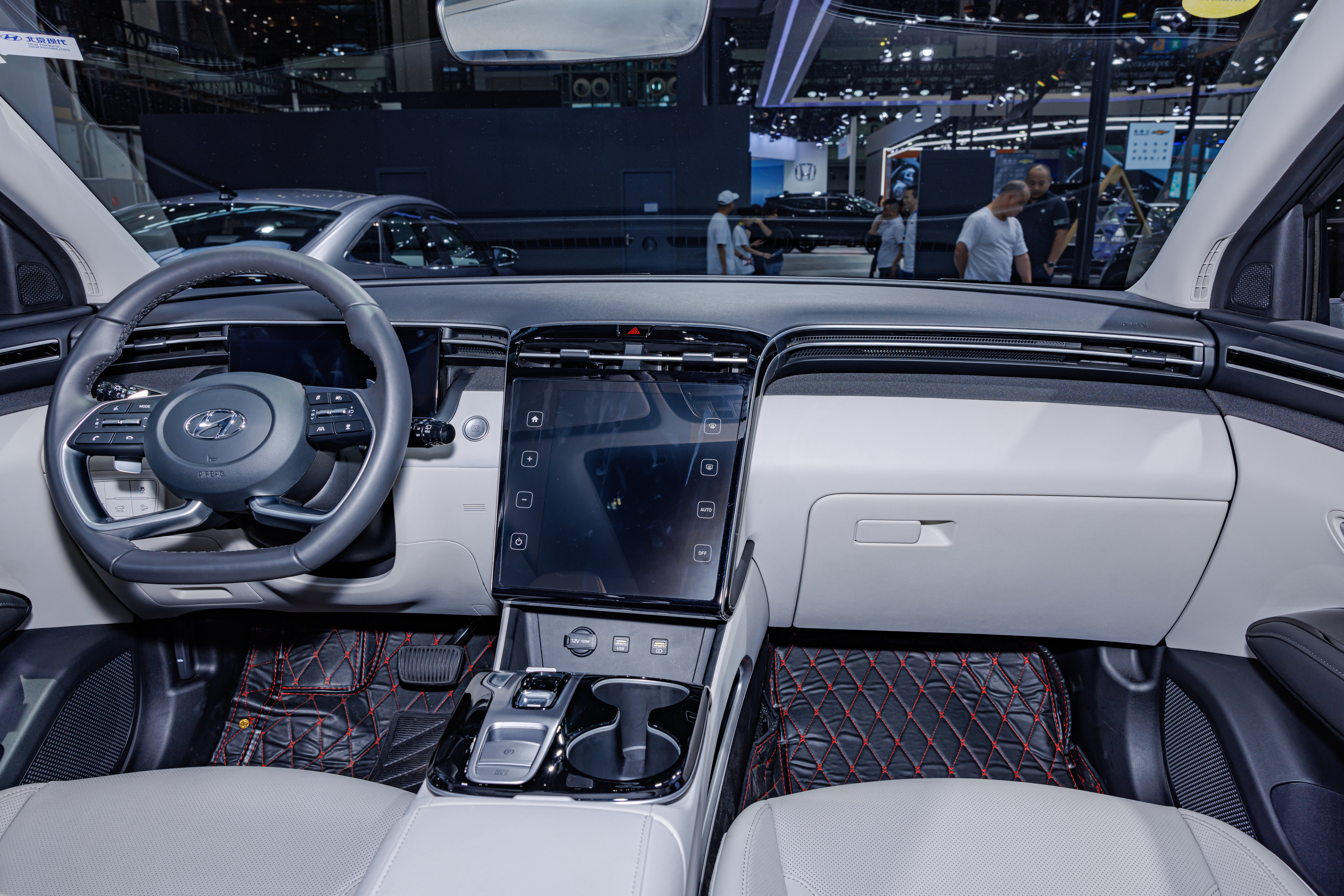
Interior (China)

=== N-Line ===
The Tucson N Line is a sport-oriented trim of the fourth-generation Tucson, introduced in 2021. It features a sportier exterior and interior design compared with the standard Tucson, including a darker parametric grille, sportier front and rear bumpers, a rear spoiler, 19-inch alloy wheels, and N Line-specific interior details. Like the regular Tucson, the Tucson N Line offers Electronically Controlled Suspension (ECS) as an option.

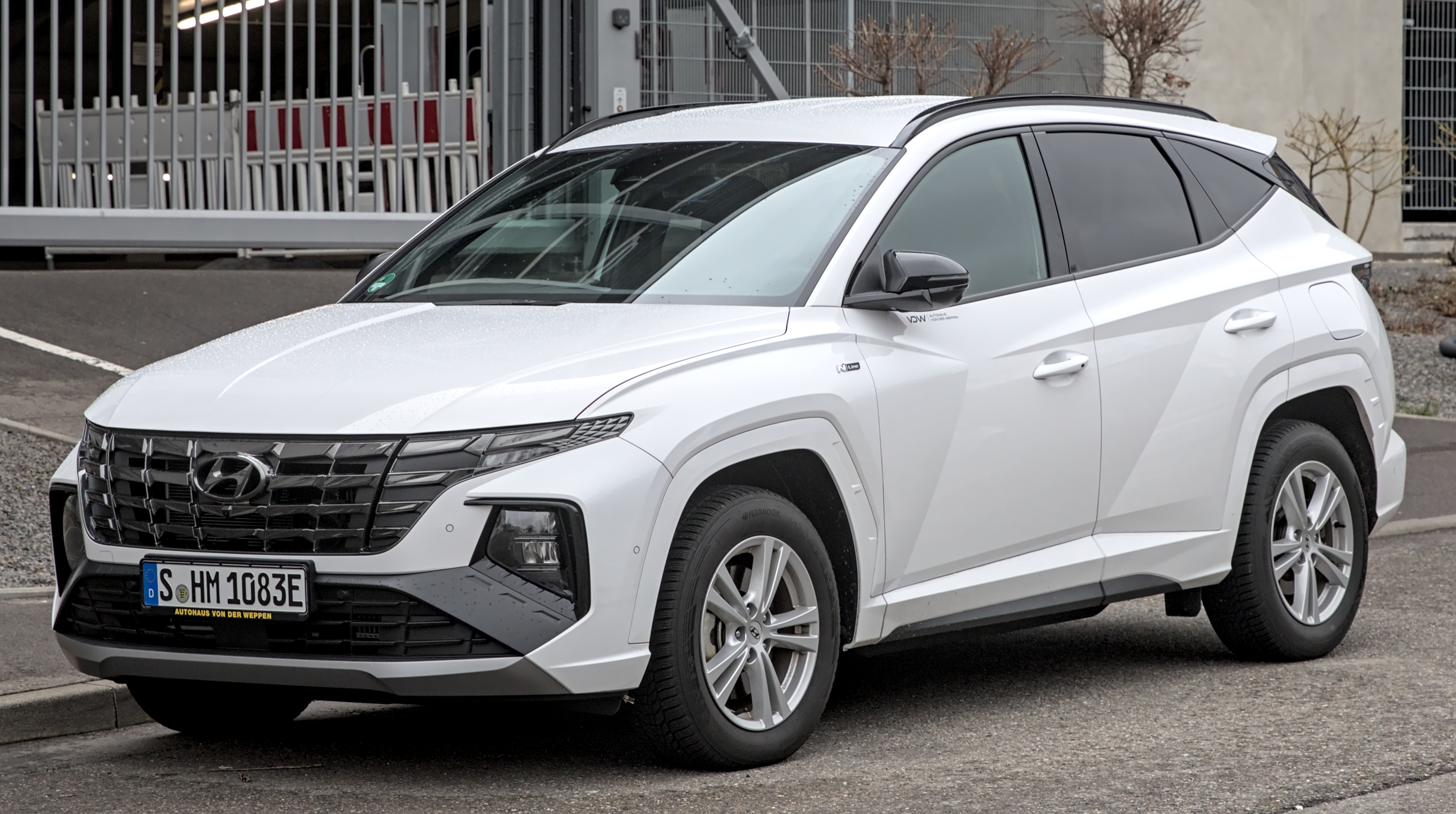
N-Line (Europe; pre-facelift, SWB)

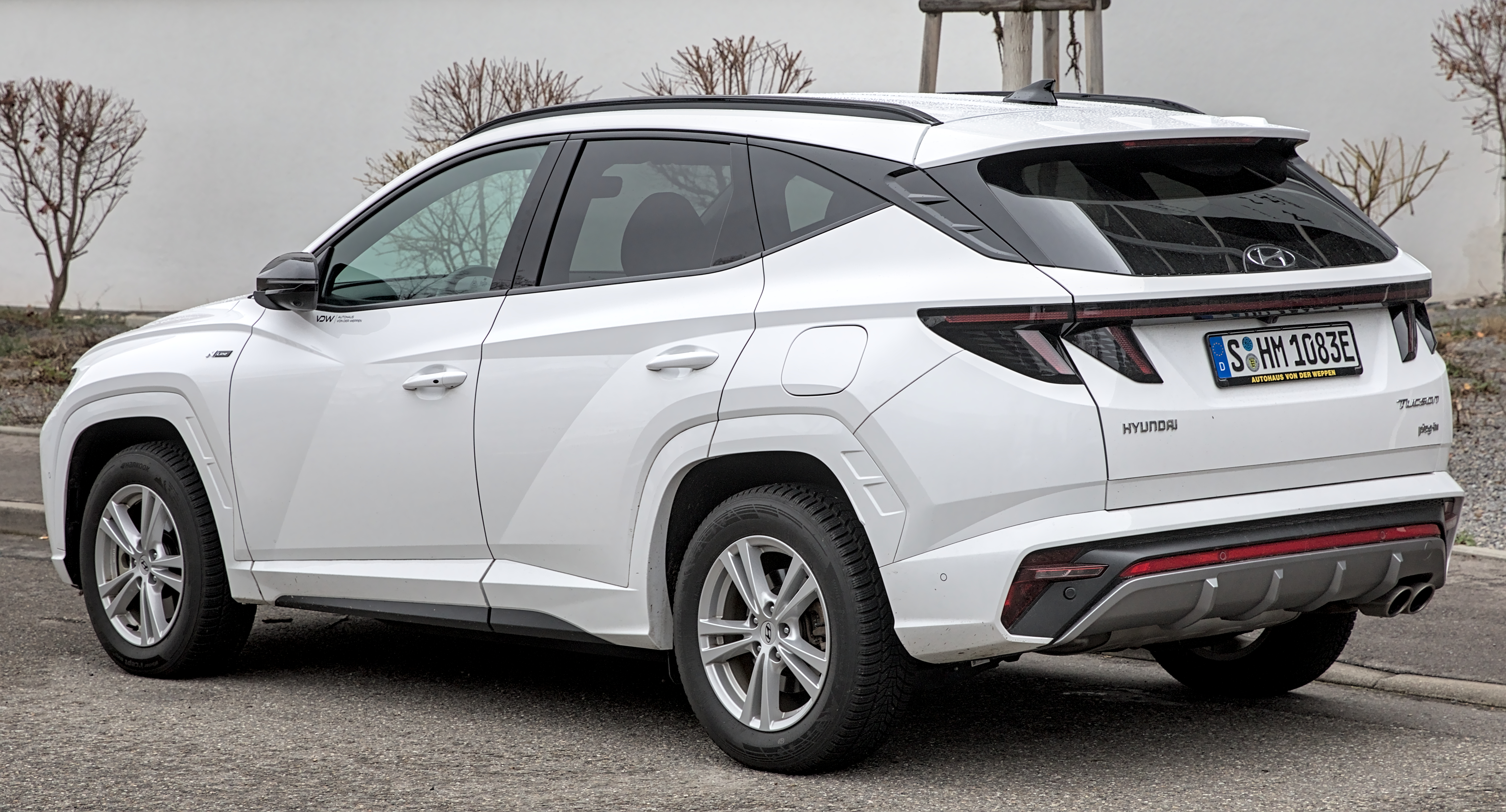
N-Line (Europe; pre-facelift, SWB)

=== Facelift ===
The facelifted fourth-generation Tucson was launched in South Korea in December 2023 as “The New Tucson” and was introduced in North America in March 2024 for the 2025 model year. Changes includes an updated front fascia with new skid plates, the "H" logo on the steering wheel being replaced with a four-dot morse code, a new switchgear for the HVAC controls and infotainment system, the gear selector was moved to the steering wheel column and a revamped centre console with a larger wireless charging pad.

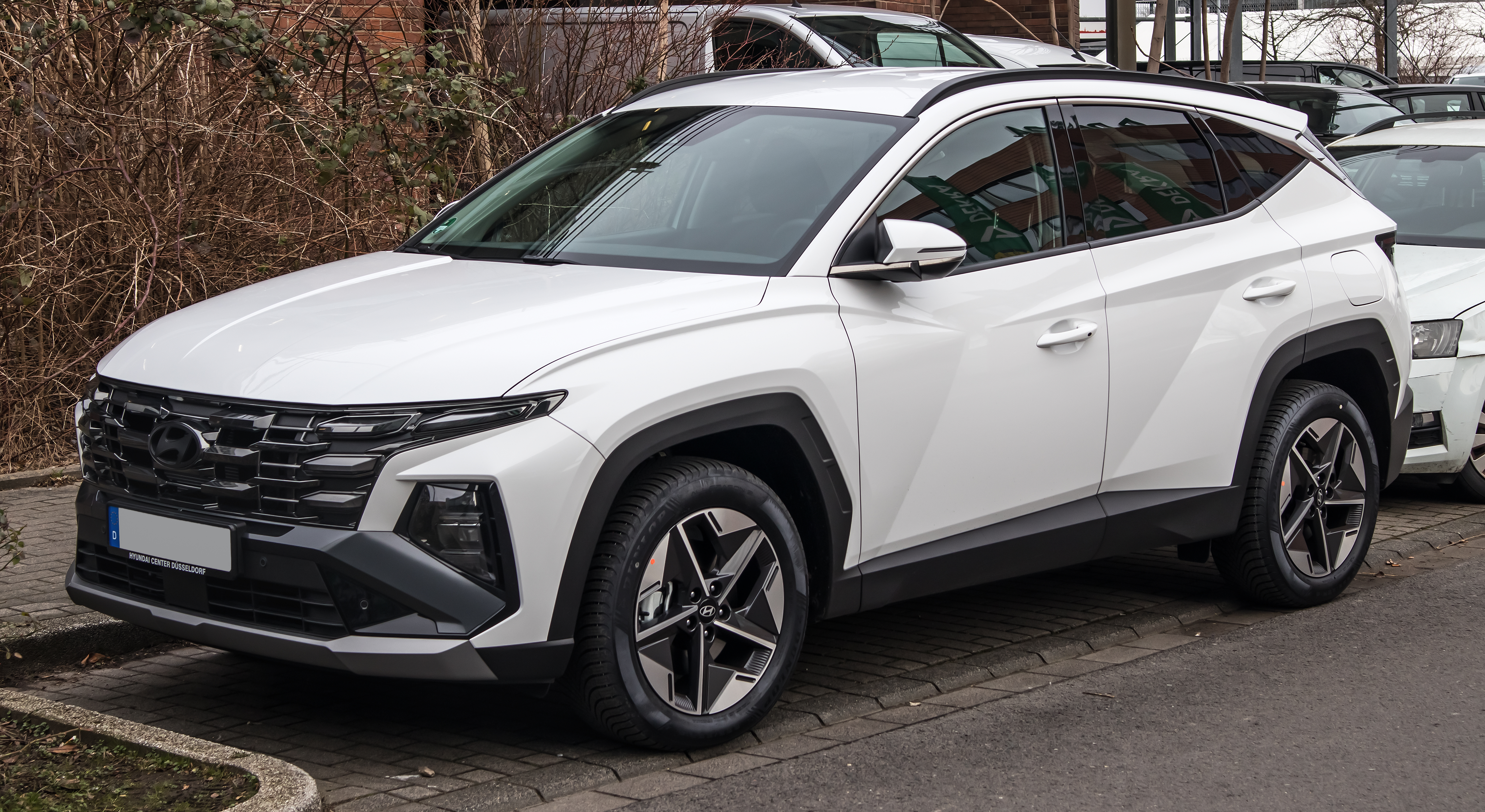
Facelift Tucson (front)

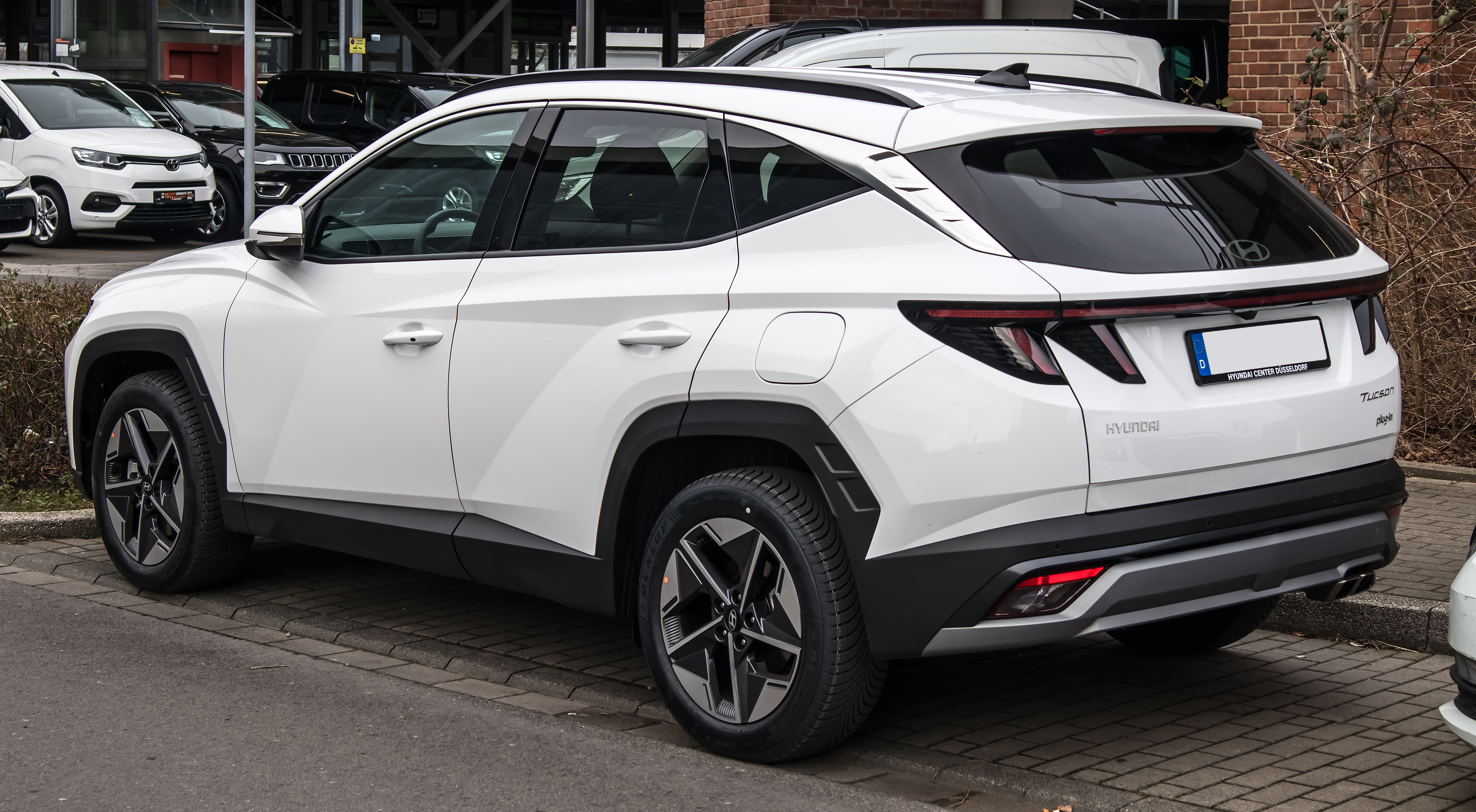
Facelift Tucson (rear)

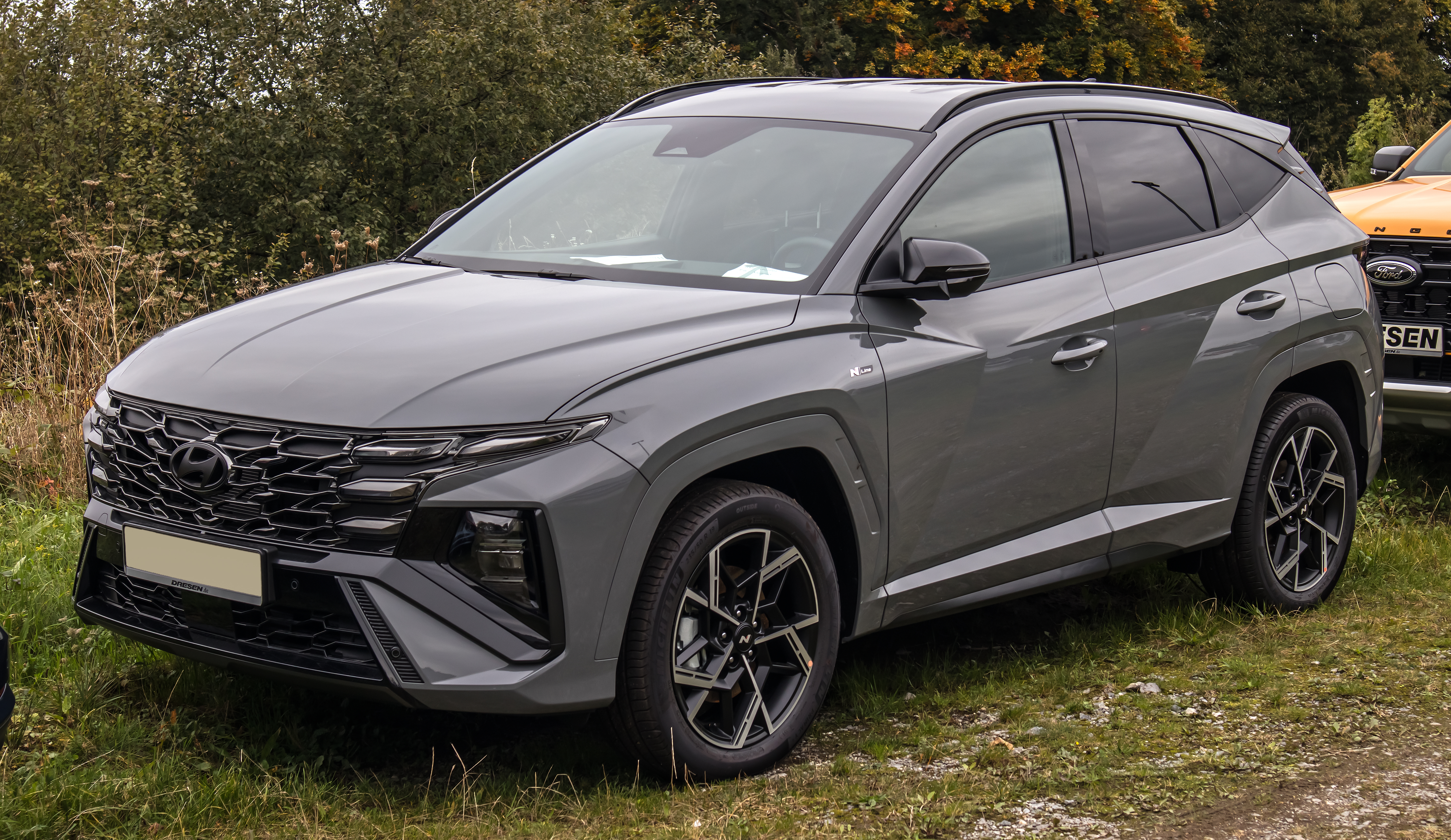
Facelift Tucson N Line (front)

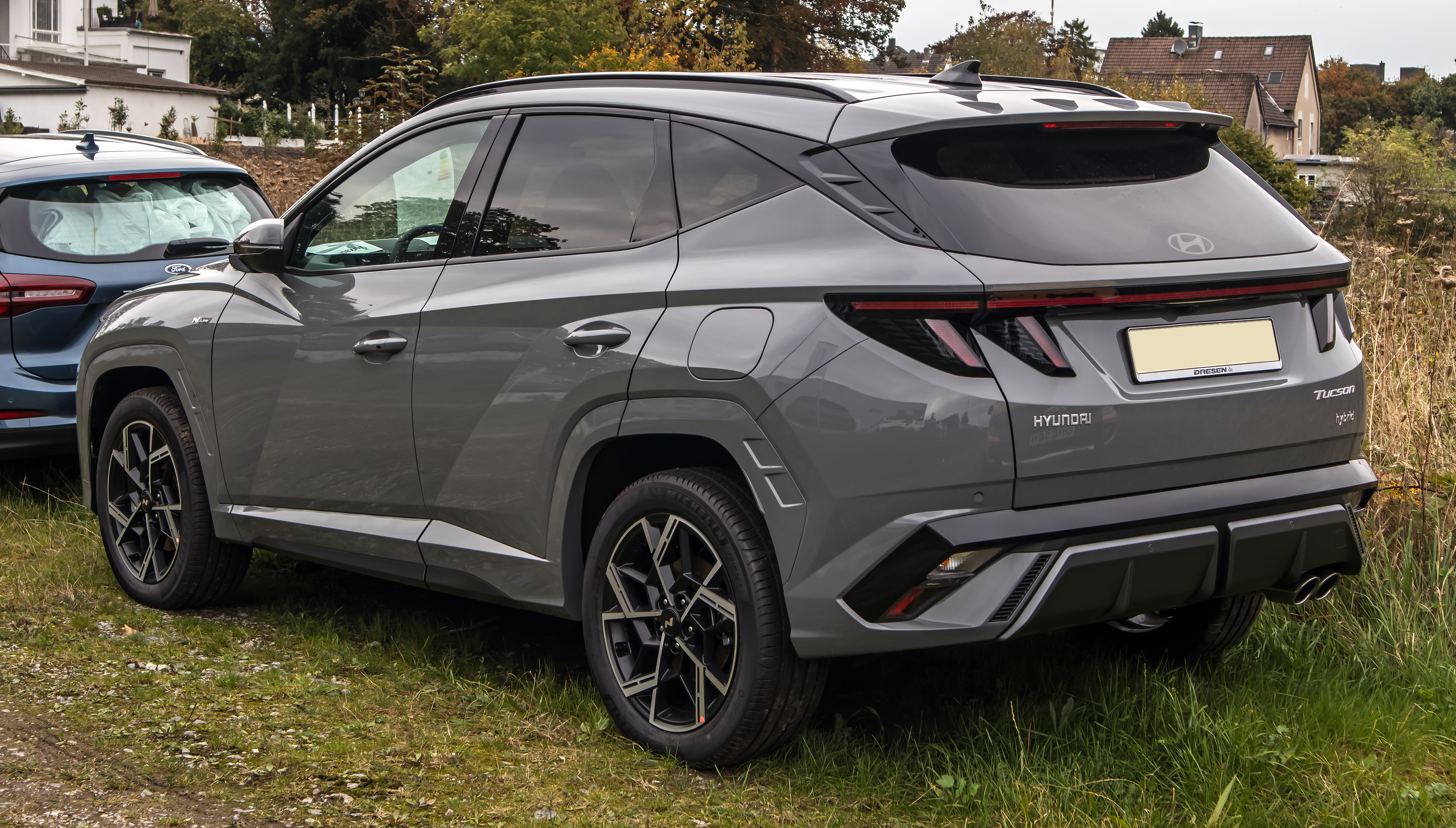
Facelift Tucson N Line (rear)

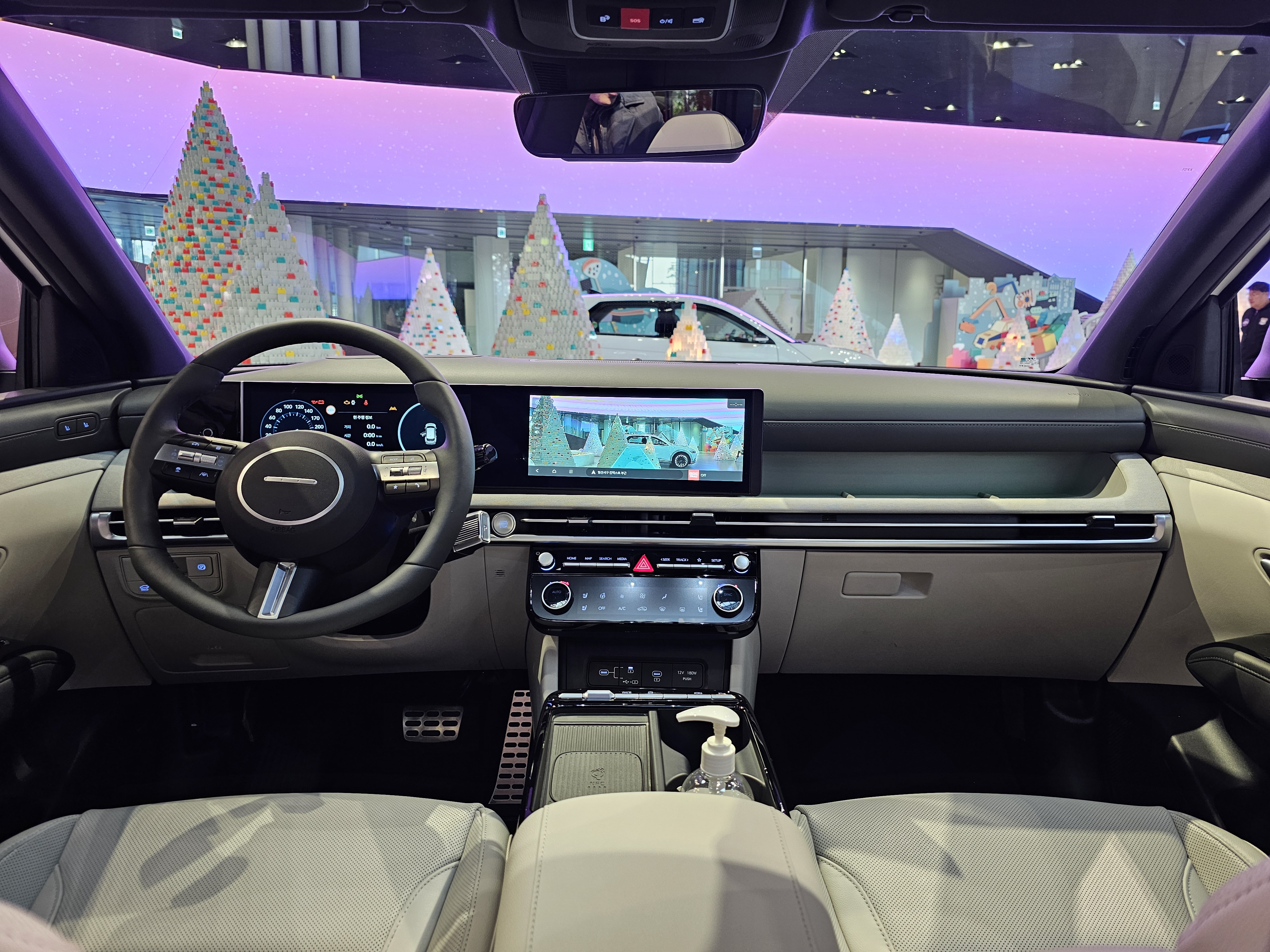
Facelift Tucson (interior, LHD)

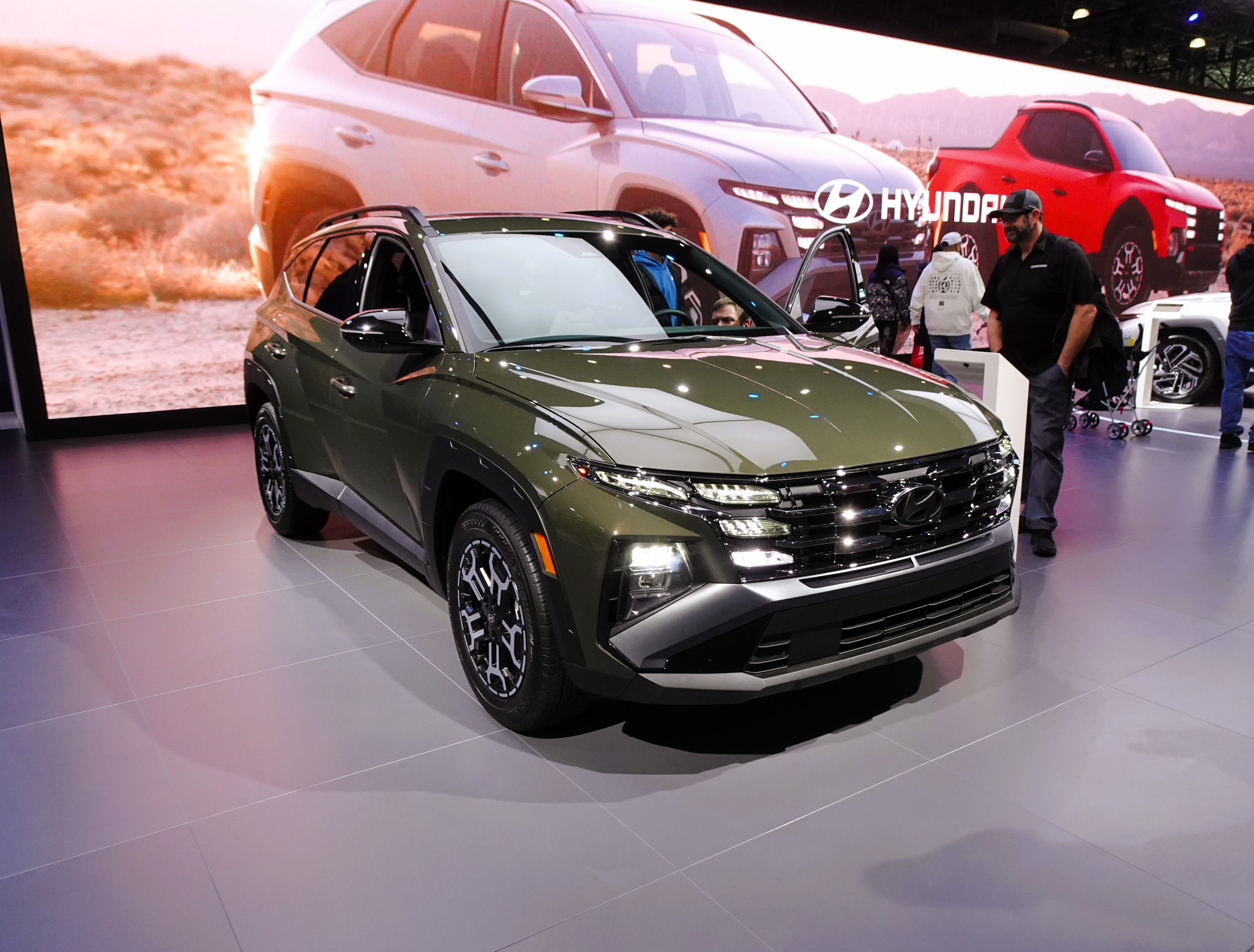
Tucson XRT

=== Markets ===
Markets where the short-wheelbase version (blue) and the long-wheelbase version (green) of the fourth-generation Tucson was planned to be sold.

==== East Asia ====
===== China =====
In China, the fourth-generation Tucson is produced and sold by Beijing Hyundai as the Tucson L, and is marketed locally as the fifth-generation Tucson L (Chinese: 第五代 途胜L). It was unveiled at the 2020 Guangzhou Motor Show; changes for the Chinese market included a larger touchscreen infotainment system. It went on sale on 12 April 2021 in four variants, powered by a 1.5-litre Smartstream T-GDi engine producing 197 hp (200 PS; 147 kW) paired with a 7-speed dual-clutch transmission.

A facelifted model, sold as the New Tucson L (全新途胜L), was launched on 26 November 2024, adding a 2.0-litre petrol hybrid alongside the existing 1.5-litre turbocharged petrol. For the 2026 model year, launched on 14 June 2026, the line-up was streamlined to four variants and the hybrid was dropped. The 1.5-litre turbocharged CVVD engine, rated at 147 kW (200 PS; 197 hp) and 253 N⋅m (187 lb⋅ft), was paired with an eight-speed automatic transmission, with both front-wheel drive and all-wheel drive offered.

===== South Korea =====
The fourth-generation Tucson was released in South Korea in September 2020. At launch it was offered with a 1.6-litre T-GDi petrol engine, a 2.0-litre CRDi diesel and a 1.6-litre T-GDi petrol hybrid.

A facelifted model, marketed as the New Tucson (더 뉴 투싼), went on sale on 6 December 2023 alongside an N Line variant, retaining the same three powertrains. For the 2026 model year, released on 7 August 2025, the diesel was discontinued, leaving the 1.6-litre T-GDi petrol and the 1.6-litre T-GDi hybrid, each also available in N Line specification.

==== Taiwan ====
The fourth-generation Tucson was launched in Taiwan on 8 December 2021, marketed as the Tucson L. At launch, it was available in two variants: GLT-A and GLT-B, both variants were powered by the 1.6-litre T-GDi petrol with 178 hp (180 PS; 133 kW). The N Line variant powered by the 1.6-litre T-GDi petrol with 178 hp (180 PS; 133 kW) was added in May 2024.

The facelifted Tucson L was launched in Taiwan on 22 April 2025, with four variants: GLT-A, GLT-B, GLTH-A, GLTH-B, GLTH-C and GLTH-C Premium, powered by 1.6-litre T-GDi petrol with 178 hp (180 PS; 133 kW) and 1.6-litre T-GDi petrol hybrid powertrains.

==== Europe ====
Produced at Hyundai Motor Manufacturing Czech, the European-market Tucson is offered solely with the short 2,680 mm (105.5 in) wheelbase.

At launch the European range comprised a 1.6-litre T-GDi petrol with 150 PS (148 hp; 110 kW) and a 1.6-litre CRDi diesel with 115 PS (113 hp; 85 kW), both with a six-speed manual transmission. A 48-volt mild hybrid system was offered with the 1.6-litre T-GDi petrol in 150 PS and 180 PS (178 hp; 132 kW) forms and with the 1.6-litre CRDi diesel in 136 PS (134 hp; 100 kW) form; mild hybrid models used either a six-speed intelligent manual transmission iMT or a seven-speed dual-clutch transmission DCT. The hybrid 1.6-litre T-GDi combined the turbocharged petrol engine with an electric motor and a 1.49 kWh lithium-ion polymer battery for a system output of 229 PS (226 hp; 169 kW), driving through a six-speed automatic transmission with optional all-wheel drive; a plug-in hybrid with a combined output of 265 PS (261 hp; 195 kW) followed in 2021.

The facelifted Tucson was revealed in November 2023 and went on sale in Europe in 2024. The range comprised a turbocharged 1.6-litre petrol, a more fuel-efficient hybrid and a range-topping plug-in hybrid. For the 2026 model year, announced on 30 September 2025, the 1.6-litre T-GDi petrol was split into a 150 PS front-wheel-drive version and a 180 PS all-wheel-drive version, and the 48-volt mild hybrid system was dropped for the petrol engines. The hybrid was uprated to 239 PS (236 hp; 176 kW), with a top speed of 196 km/h (122 mph) and a towing capacity of 1,510 kg (3,330 lb), and an N Line X trim was added.

==== Latin America ====
===== Argentina =====
The fourth-generation Tucson was launched in Argentina on 9 September 2024, with two variants: Safety 2.0 2WD and Ultimate 1.6T 4WD. For powertrains, the Safety variant uses the 2.0-litre MPi petrol with front-wheel drive and the Ultimate variant uses the 1.6-litre T-GDi petrol with all-wheel drive. In July 2025, the Hybrid variant with all-wheel drive was introduced in Argentina as the flagship variant.

===== Mexico =====
The fourth-generation Tucson was launched in Mexico on 10 February 2021, with three trim levels: GLS, Limited and Limited Tech, all powered by a 2.5-litre GDi petrol engine. The Tucson sold in Mexico is the European short-wheelbase model imported from the Czech Republic. A hybrid version based on the Limited trim was added to the range in August 2022. The facelifted model was introduced in September 2024 for the 2025 model year. The current Mexican range includes the 2026 Tucson, 2026 Tucson Híbrida and 2026 Tucson Híbrida N Line.

Long-wheelbase Tucson models have been built at Kia's Mexican plant in Pesquería since 2024, exclusively for export to the United States and Canada.

==== North America ====
The fourth-generation Tucson was revealed for the North American market in November 2020 for the 2022 model year. Offered with the long-wheelbase specification, it featured a 2.5-litre Smartstream petrol engine rated at 187 hp (190 PS; 139 kW) and 178 lb⋅ft (241 N⋅m; 24.6 kg⋅m) of torque. A hybrid version pairing the 1.6-litre T-GDi engine with a 44 kW electric motor produced 226 hp (229 PS; 169 kW) and 258 lb⋅ft (350 N⋅m; 35.7 kg⋅m) of torque, and a plug-in hybrid powered by a 13.8 kWh battery offered 51 km (32 mi) of electric-only range.

Despite resistance from the labor union in South Korea, Hyundai started to produce the new Tucson in the United States due to its increasing popularity from February 2021. It is built alongside the Elantra, Sonata, Santa Fe and Santa Cruz at Hyundai Motor Manufacturing Alabama in Montgomery. Since June 2024, production for the North American market has also taken place at Kia's Mexican plant in Pesquería. In April 2025, in response to U.S. tariffs on imported vehicles, Mexican-built long-wheelbase Tucsons were redirected to Canada, while the U.S. market continued to be supplied by the locally assembled long-wheelbase model.

The facelifted 2025 Tucson made its North American debut at the New York International Auto Show on 27 March 2024. The 2.5-litre models reached U.S. dealerships in June 2024, followed by the 1.6-litre turbo hybrid and plug-in hybrid later that summer. The 2.5-litre naturally aspirated four-cylinder, shared across the petrol range including the off-road-oriented XRT, produced 187 hp (190 PS; 139 kW) and 178 lb⋅ft (241 N⋅m). The hybrid, which included the sporty N Line, had a system output of 231 hp (234 PS; 172 kW), and the plug-in hybrid 268 hp (272 PS; 200 kW). All-wheel drive was optional on the petrol models and standard on the hybrid and plug-in hybrid.

==== Oceania ====
===== Australia =====
The fourth generation Tucson was launched in Australia on 26 April 2021, with three trim levels: Tucson, Elite and Highlander. An N-line package is available as an option on all trim levels and adds a sportier look and various features. Three powertrain options are available on the Australian Tucson: a 1.6-litre T-GDi turbocharged petrol paired with a 7-speed dual-clutch automatic, a 2.0-litre MPi petrol paired with a 6-speed automatic, and finally a 2.0-litre CRDi turbocharged diesel paired with an 8-speed automatic. All powertrains, except the 2.0-litre MPi petrol, comes equipped with AWD.

The facelifted Tucson debuted in Australia on 17 June 2024, which saw the discontinuation of the diesel engine option and the availability of the Hybrid all-wheel drive powertrain, and the renaming of the flagship Highlander trim level to Premium. In August 2025, the 1.6-litre T-GDi turbocharged petrol with a 7-speed dual-clutch automatic was discontinued and the number of variants available was reduced from 17 to nine.

In August 2026, Hyundai Australia announced that it will introduce the Tucson BLK Edition, a variant of the Tucson with blacked-out exterior trims. It will be imported from Vietnam as opposed to other variants that are imported from South Korea, giving access to extra production capacity for the Australian market.

===== New Zealand =====
The fourth-generation Tucson was launched in New Zealand in 2021 in five trim levels: Tucson, Active, Elite, Limited and N Line. Three powertrains were offered: a 2.0-litre MPi petrol with front-wheel drive and a six-speed automatic, a 1.6-litre T-GDi turbocharged petrol and a 1.6-litre CRDi turbocharged diesel, both with all-wheel drive and a seven-speed dual-clutch transmission. In the second half of 2022, the hybrid and plug-in hybrid versions were added to the range for the Entry and Elite trims.

The facelifted model, marketed locally as the Tucson Series II, began customer deliveries in April 2025 with the 1.6-litre T-GDi hybrid as its headline powertrain. The hybrid switched from the Czech-built short-wheelbase body to the South Korean-built long-wheelbase body, increasing the wheelbase from 2,680 mm (105.5 in) to 2,755 mm (108.5 in) and enlarging second-row and cargo space. With the switch to Series II, the turbocharged diesel and the 1.6-litre T-GDi petrol were discontinued and two entry-level 2.0-litre MPi petrol variants were added, while the 1.6-litre T-GDi hybrid was carried over unchanged and fitted to every other variant in the range.

==== South Africa ====
The fourth-generation Tucson went on sale in South Africa on 10 March 2022, with three trim levels: Premium, Executive and Elite. Two powertrain options are available: a 2.0-litre MPi petrol and a 2.0-litre CRDi turbocharged diesel. The N-Line trim was added in May 2023 as the flagship variant, powered by a 2.0-litre MPi petrol.

The facelifted Tucson was launched in South Africa on 4 April 2025 with three variants: 2.0 Premium, 2.0D Executive and 2.0 AWD N Line. Powertrain choices remain unchanged from the pre-facelift model.

==== South Asia ====
===== India =====
The fourth-generation Tucson was launched in India on 10 August 2022, with two trim levels: Platinum and Signature. Two powertrain options are available: a 2.0-litre MPi petrol and a 2.0-litre CRDi turbocharged diesel. In November 2025, Hyundai discontinued the Tucson from the Indian market due to declining sales.

===== Pakistan =====
The fourth-generation Tucson was launched in Pakistan by Hyundai Nishat Motors on 21 April 2025, with two trim levels: Hybrid Smart and Hybrid Signature. Both use a 1.6-litre T-GDi hybrid powertrain combining a turbocharged petrol engine with a 44.2 kW electric motor for a combined output of 230 PS (227 hp; 169 kW) and 367 N⋅m (271 lb⋅ft) of torque. The Smart is front-wheel drive and the Signature is all-wheel drive.

==== Southeast Asia ====
===== Indonesia =====
The fourth-generation Tucson went on sale in Indonesia on 21 November 2024 as the facelifted model. .Imported from South Korea the Indonesian market fourth-generation Tucson is offered with a choice of two engine options; a 2.0-litre MPi petrol and a 1.6-litre T-GDi petrol hybrid, each in a single variant.

===== Malaysia =====
The fourth-generation Tucson was launched in Malaysia on 10 November 2023, with three trim levels: Lite, Plus and Max. Two powertrain options are available: a 2.0-litre MPi petrol and a 1.6-litre T-GDi turbocharged petrol.

The facelifted Tucson was launched on 2 July 2025, with three trim levels: Style, Prime and Prestige. The facelift model is available with the same powertrain options from the pre-facelift model, however, the Hybrid version debuted for the facelift model and an all-wheel drive option was made available for the 1.6-litre T-GDi engine.

===== Philippines =====
The fourth-generation Tucson was launched in the Philippines on 20 June 2022 and became available at dealerships on 17 August 2022, offered in two trim levels: the GLS with a 2.0-litre MPi petrol engine and the GLS+ with a 2.0-litre CRDi turbocharged diesel. The facelifted model was introduced on 18 July 2024, adding a 1.6-litre T-GDi hybrid to the GLS grade. The updated petrol produces 156 hp (158 PS; 116 kW) and 192 N⋅m (142 lb⋅ft) with a six-speed automatic transmission, and the diesel 186 hp (189 PS; 139 kW) and 416 N⋅m (307 lb⋅ft) with an eight-speed automatic.

===== Singapore =====
The fourth-generation Tucson was launched in Singapore on 7 July 2021, with three variants. Two powertrain options are available: a 1.6-litre T-GDi turbocharged petrol and a 1.6-litre Hybrid turbocharged petrol (followed at a later date).

The facelifted Tucson debuted in Singapore on 11 January 2025 with the addition of the N-Line variant.

===== Vietnam =====
The fourth-generation Tucson was launched in Vietnam on 27 December 2021, with four variants. Three powertrain options are available: 1.6-litre T-GDi turbocharged petrol, a 2.0-litre MPi petrol and a 2.0-litre CRDi turbocharged diesel.

The facelifted Tucson was launched in Vietnam on 9 October 2024 with the same variants from the pre-facelift model. The N-Line variant using the 1.6-litre T-GDi turbocharged petrol was added in June 2025.

=== Powertrain ===
Specs
| Model | Years | Engine | Transmissions | Power | Torque | 0–100 km/h (0–62 mph) (official) | Top speed |
Petrol engines
| Smartstream G1.5 T-GDi | 2020–present | 1,497 cc (91.4 cu in) turbocharged I4 | 7-speed DCT | 200 PS (147 kW; 197 hp) @ 6,000 rpm | 25.8 kg⋅m (253 N⋅m; 187 lbf⋅ft) @ 2,200–4,000 rpm | | 205 km/h (127 mph) |
| Smartstream G1.6 T-GDi | 2020–present | 1,598 cc (97.5 cu in) turbocharged I4 | 7-speed DCT | 180 PS (132 kW; 178 hp) @ 5,500 rpm | 27 kg⋅m (265 N⋅m; 195 lbf⋅ft) @ 1,500–4,500 rpm | 8.8s (FWD); 9.0s (AWD) | 201 km/h (125 mph) |
| Smartstream G2.0 MPi | 2021–present | 1,999 cc (122.0 cu in) I4 | 6-speed manual | 156 PS (115 kW; 154 hp) @ 6,200 rpm | 19.6 kg⋅m (192 N⋅m; 142 lbf⋅ft) @ 4,500 rpm | 10.8s (FWD); 11.1s (AWD) | 186 km/h (116 mph) |
| Smartstream G2.0 MPi | 2021–present | 1,999 cc (122.0 cu in) I4 | 6-speed automatic | 156 PS (115 kW; 154 hp) @ 6,200 rpm | 19.6 kg⋅m (192 N⋅m; 142 lbf⋅ft) @ 4,500 rpm | 11.4s (FWD); 11.6s (AWD) | 181 km/h (112 mph) |
| Smartstream G2.5 GDi | 2022-present(North American model years) | 2,497 cc (152.4 cu in) I4 | 8-speed automatic | 190 PS (140 kW; 187 hp) @ 6,100 rpm | 24.6 kg⋅m (241 N⋅m; 178 lbf⋅ft) @ 4,000 rpm | 9.4s | 197 km/h (122 mph) |
Petrol hybrid
| Smartstream G1.6 T-GDi 48V (MHEV) | 2020–present | 1,598 cc (97.5 cu in) turbocharged I4 | 6-speed manual (iMT) | 150 PS (110 kW; 148 hp) @ 5,500 rpm | 25.5 kg⋅m (250 N⋅m; 184 lbf⋅ft) @ 1,500–4,000 rpm | 10.3s | 189 km/h (117 mph) |
| Smartstream G1.6 T-GDi 48V (MHEV) | 2020–present | 1,598 cc (97.5 cu in) turbocharged I4 | 7-speed DCT (dry) | 150 PS (110 kW; 148 hp) @ 5,500 rpm | 25.5 kg⋅m (250 N⋅m; 184 lbf⋅ft) @ 1,500–4,000 rpm | 9.6s | 189 km/h (117 mph) |
| Smartstream G1.6 T-GDi 48V (MHEV) | 2020–present | 1,598 cc (97.5 cu in) turbocharged I4 | 6-speed manual (iMT) | 180 PS (132 kW; 178 hp) @ 5,500 rpm | 27 kg⋅m (265 N⋅m; 195 lbf⋅ft) @ 1,500–4,500 rpm | 9.4s | 205 km/h (127 mph) |
| Smartstream G1.6 T-GDi 48V (MHEV) | 2020–present | 1,598 cc (97.5 cu in) turbocharged I4 | 7-speed DCT (dry) | 180 PS (132 kW; 178 hp) @ 5,500 rpm | 27 kg⋅m (265 N⋅m; 195 lbf⋅ft) @ 1,500–4,500 rpm | 9.0s | 201 km/h (124.9 mph) |
| Smartstream G1.6 T-GDi Hybrid (HEV) | 2020–present | 1,598 cc (97.5 cu in) turbocharged I4 | 6-speed automatic | 230 PS (169 kW; 227 hp) @ 5,500 rpm | 35.7 kg⋅m (350 N⋅m; 258 lbf⋅ft) @ 1,500–4,400 rpm | 8.0s (FWD); 8.3s (AWD) | 193 km/h (120 mph) |
| Smartstream G1.6 T-GDi Plug-in Hybrid (PHEV) | 2021–present | 1,598 cc (97.5 cu in) turbocharged I4 | 6-speed automatic | 265 PS (195 kW; 261 hp) @ 5,500 rpm | 35.7 kg⋅m (350 N⋅m; 258 lbf⋅ft) @ 1,500–4,400 rpm | 8.6s (AWD) | 193 km/h (120 mph) |
| Smartstream G2.0 GDi Hybrid | | 1,999 cc (122.0 cu in) I4 | 6-speed automatic | 195 PS (143 kW; 192 hp) @ 6,000 rpm | 35.7 kg⋅m (350 N⋅m; 258 lbf⋅ft) | | 160 km/h (99 mph) |
Diesel
| Smartstream D1.6 CRDi | 2020–present | 1,598 cc (97.5 cu in) turbocharged I4 | 6-speed manual | 115 PS (85 kW; 113 hp) @ 4,000 rpm | 28.6 kg⋅m (280 N⋅m; 207 lbf⋅ft) @ 1,500–2,750 rpm | 12.1s | 175 km/h (109 mph) |
| Smartstream D1.6 CRDi 48V (MHEV) | 2020–present | 1,598 cc (97.5 cu in) turbocharged I4 | 6-speed manual (iMT) | 136 PS (100 kW; 134 hp) @ 4,000 rpm | 32.6 kg⋅m (320 N⋅m; 236 lbf⋅ft) @ 2,000–2,250 rpm | 11.4s | 180 km/h (112 mph) |
| Smartstream D1.6 CRDi 48V (MHEV) | 2020–present | 1,598 cc (97.5 cu in) turbocharged I4 | 7-speed DCT (dry) | 136 PS (100 kW; 134 hp) @ 4,000 rpm | 32.6 kg⋅m (320 N⋅m; 236 lbf⋅ft) @ 2,000–2,250 rpm | 11.4s (FWD); 11.6s (AWD) | 180 km/h (112 mph) |
| Smartstream D2.0 CRDi | 2022–2024 (Australian model years) | 1,998 cc (121.9 cu in) turbocharged I4 | 8-speed automatic | 186 PS (137 kW; 183 hp) @ 4,000 rpm | 42.5 kg⋅m (417 N⋅m; 307 lbf⋅ft) @ 2,000–2,750 rpm | 9.2s (FWD); 9.4s (AWD) | 201 km/h (125 mph) |
| Smartstream D2.0 CRDi | 2024–2025 (South Korean model years) | 1,998 cc (121.9 cu in) turbocharged I4 | 8-speed automatic | 184 PS (135 kW; 181 hp) @ 4,000 rpm | 42.5 kg⋅m (417 N⋅m; 307 lbf⋅ft) @ 2,000–2,750 rpm | 9.2s (FWD); 9.4s (AWD) | 201 km/h (125 mph) |

=== Safety ===
| ANCAP (2021, aligned with Euro NCAP) | | Euro NCAP test results (2021, aligned with ANCAP) | | IIHS scores (2022 model year) | | | | Latin NCAP 3.0 (2022) | | Bharat NCAP (2024) | | | | Latin NCAP 3.0 (2025) | | TNCAP Version 1 (2025) | |
|---|---|---|---|---|---|---|---|---|---|---|---|---|---|---|---|---|---|
| Overall | 5/5 stars | Overall | 5/5 stars | Small overlap front (driver) | Good | | | Overall | 3/5 stars | Overall | (Adult) | Overall | (Child) | Overall | 3/5 stars | Overall | 3/5 stars |
| Adult occupant | 86% | Adult occupant | 86% | Small overlap front (passenger) | Good | | | Adult occupant | 82% | | | | | Adult occupant | 84% | Adult occupant | 72% |
| Child occupant | 87% | Child occupant | 87% | Moderate overlap front | Good | | | Child occupant | 70% | | | | | Child occupant | 92% | Child occupant | 55% |
| Vulnerable road users | 66% | Vulnerable road users | 66% | Side (original test) | Good | | | Pedestrian and vulnerable road users | 48% | | | | | Pedestrian and vulnerable road users | 75% | Pedestrian and vulnerable road users | 52% |
| Safety assist | 70% | Safety assist | 70% | Roof strength | Good | | | Safety assist systems | 56% | | | | | Safety assist systems | 96% | Safety assist systems | 71% |
| | | | | Head restraints and seats | Good | | | | | | | | | | | | |
| | | | | Headlights | Good | Acceptable | varies by trim/option | | | | | | | | | | |
| | | | | Front crash prevention (vehicle-to-vehicle) | Superior | | optional | | | | | | | | | | |
| | | | | Front crash prevention (vehicle-to-vehicle) | Superior | | standard | | | | | | | | | | |
| | | | | Front crash prevention (vehicle-to-pedestrian, day) | Superior | | optional | | | | | | | | | | |
| | | | | Front crash prevention (vehicle-to-pedestrian, day) | Superior | | standard | | | | | | | | | | |
| | | | | Seat belt reminders | Acceptable | | | | | | | | | | | | |
| | | | | Child seat anchors (LATCH) ease of use | Acceptable | | | | | | | | | | | | |

== Fifth generation (NX5; 2026) ==
Fifth generation
- 2027 Hyundai Tucson Inspiration

Overview
- Model code: NX5
- Production: 2026–present
- Model years: 2027
- Assembly: South Korea: Ulsan (Ulsan Plant 5); Czechia: Nošovice (HMMC); United States: Montgomery, Alabama (HMMA)

Body and chassis
- Platform: Hyundai-Kia N3/N4

Dimensions
- Wheelbase: 2,720 mm (107.1 in) (SWB); 2,785 mm (109.6 in) (LWB)
- Length: 4,560 mm (179.5 in) (SWB); 4,700 mm (185.0 in) (LWB)
- Width: 1,900 mm (74.8 in) (SWB); 1,905 mm (75.0 in) (LWB)
- Height: 1,670–1,685 mm (65.7–66.3 in)

The fifth generation Tucson was revealed on 19 August 2026.

Similar to its predecessor, the fifth generation Tucson is offered in two lengths – a standard wheelbase variant primarily for Europe, and a long wheelbase variant for North America, South Korea, Australia and China. Both variants have grown in all dimensions. Unlike its predecessor which has virtually no styling differences between models, the fifth generation models feature differently sloped D-pillars, different quarter panels and rear doors.

A boxy, radical design under the "Art of Steel" design language also used across Hyundai's other vehicles is featured, including design elements such as split headlights, front and rear light bars, sharp body creases and prominent fender flares.

The interior is also fully redesigned, with a display setup consisting of a slim driver display and either a 12.9-inch or 17-inch central display powered by Hyundai's Pleos Connect software. Below the central display, Hyundai has kept physical dials and buttons for the climate control and select infotainment functions. "Ergo Motion" seats are used, offering optional heating, ventilating and massaging functions. The rear doors are able to open up to 83 degrees, up from 73. Additional features include 100 W USB-C charging ports, a smartphone-operated digital key and a 12-speaker Bang & Olufsen sound system. Furthermore, for the long wheelbase model, second-row headroom is increased by 29 mm (1.1 in), while cargo space is significantly increased to 41.7 cu ft (1,180 L).

An XRT Pro variant is also available, with rugged styling elements, increased ground clearance, all-terrain tyres and skid plates.

The N Line variant was unveiled on 12 October 2026 at the Paris Motor Show 2026 in Europe alongside the Bayon N Line.

Rear view

N Line

N Line rear

XRT

XRT rear

=== Powertrain ===
The fifth generation Tucson is available with two engines, each available in either front- or all-wheel-drive. The standard option is a turbocharged 1.6-liter inline-four engine, producing 184 hp (187 PS; 137 kW) and 195 lb⋅ft (264 N⋅m) of torque, while the upgraded option is a hybrid pairing the same engine with two electric motors, producing a combined 233 hp (236 PS; 174 kW) and 280 lb⋅ft (380 N⋅m).

=== Markets ===
==== South Korea ====
The fifth-generation Tucson was released in South Korea in September 2026.

== Sales ==
| Calendar year | South Korea | U.S. | Canada | Mexico | Europe | Malaysia (Note: Figures based on registration (Malaysia)) | China | Indonesia | |
| Calendar year | South Korea | U.S. | Canada | Mexico | Europe | Malaysia | China | Petrol | HEV |
|---|---|---|---|---|---|---|---|---|---|
| 2004 | | 7,074 | | | 17,664 | 22 | | | |
| 2005 | | 61,048 | | | 63,585 | 297 | | 264 | |
| 2006 | | 52,067 | | | 60,500 | 258 | | 155 | |
| 2007 | | 41,476 | | | 53,598 | 218 | | 77 | |
| 2008 | | 19,027 | | | 28,275 | 139 | | 31 | |
| 2009 | | 15,411 | | | 20,485 | 156 | | 5 | |
| 2010 | | 39,594 | | | 53,112 | 975 | | 146 | |
| 2011 | | 47,232 | | | 74,662 | 2,015 | | 989 | |
| 2012 | | 48,878 | 13,969 | | 87,963 | 1,541 | | 834 | |
| 2013 | | 41,906 | 11,685 | | 88,831 | 1,174 | | 548 | |
| 2014 | | 47,306 | 11,856 | 3,755 | 93,540 | 942 | | 237 | |
| 2015 | | 63,591 | 14,699 | 6,885 | 120,358 | 624 | | 127 | |
| 2016 | 56,687 | 89,713 | 23,789 | 10,457 | 158,113 | 763 | | 183 | |
| 2017 | 46,382 | 114,735 | 30,467 | 9,879 | 152,875 | 354 | | 249 | |
| 2018 | 42,623 | 142,263 | 28,634 | 8,541 | 137,618 | 411 | | 162 | |
| 2019 | 36,758 | 137,381 | 30,075 | 5,965 | 136,608 | 348 | | 129 | |
| 2020 | 22,179 | 123,657 | 28,444 | 4,574 | 90,594 | 103 | | 51 (Note: Sales of the third-generation Tucson were discontinued in Indonesia by late 2020 following a distributor restructuring, as the brand prioritised locally assembled vehicles.) | |
| 2021 | 48,376 | 150,949 | 25,487 | 4,350 | 143,836 | 0 | | | |
| 2022 | 32,890 | 175,307 | 21,884 | 8,359 | 150,803 | 3 | | | |
| 2023 | 43,744 | 209,624 | 26,109 | 7,034 | 133,685 | 12 | 52,548 | 1 | |
| 2024 | 55,257 | 206,126 | 29,837 | 7,430 | 125,384 | 46 | 29,312 | 11 | 72 |
| 2025 | 53,901 | 234,230 | 41,840 | 5,143 | 118,843 | 94 | 20,703 | 18 | 76 |

== See also ==
- List of Hyundai vehicles
