= Toyota Corolla (E210) =

Twelfth-generation Toyota Corolla

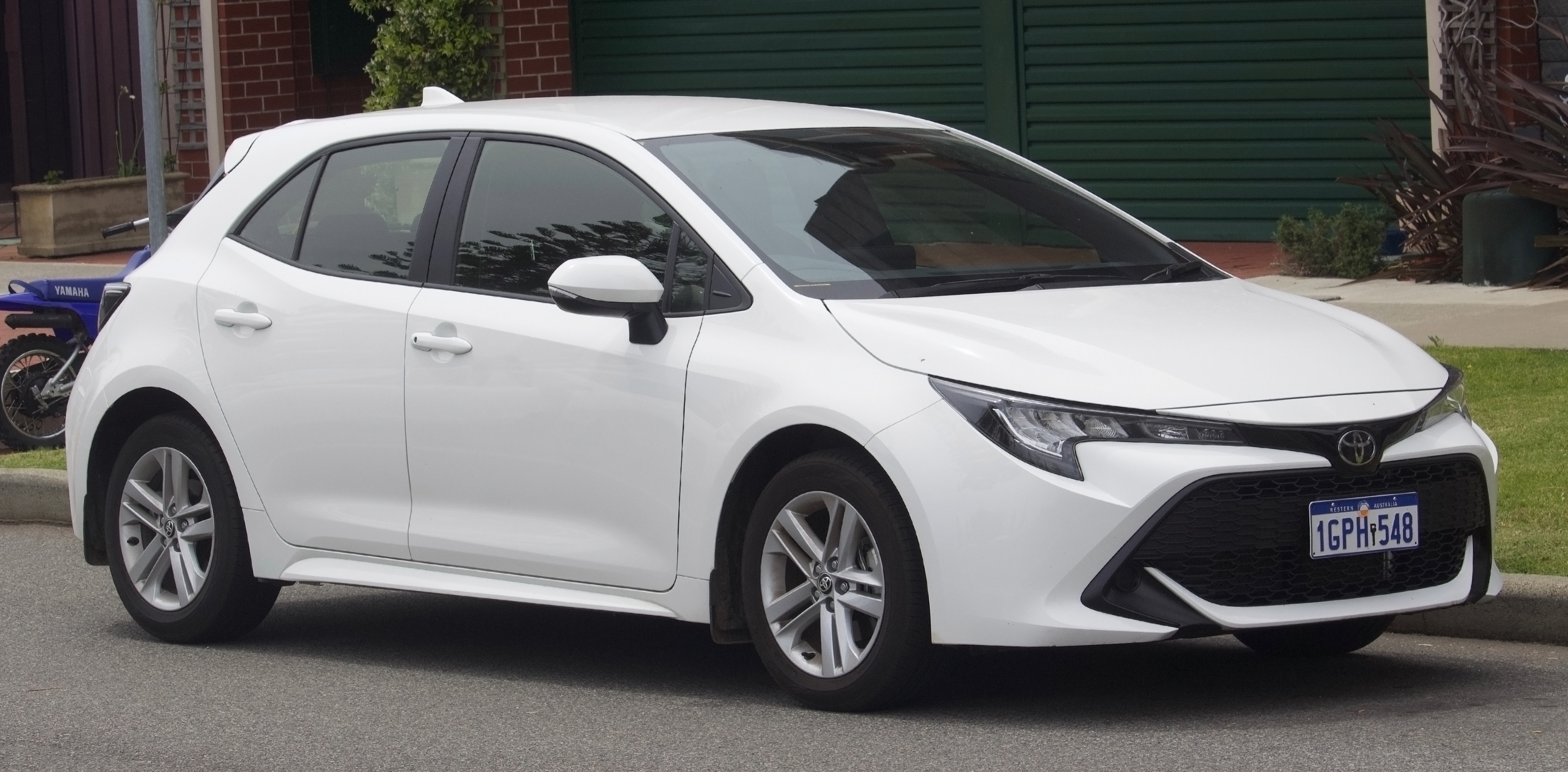
- 2018 Toyota Corolla Ascent Sport hatchback (MZEA12, Australia)

Overview
- Manufacturer: Toyota
- Model code: E210
- Also called: Toyota Auris (hatchback, Taiwan, 2018–2020); Toyota Allion (long-wheelbase saloon, FAW Toyota; China); Toyota Levin (saloon, GAC Toyota; China); Toyota Levin GT / Levin L (long-wheelbase saloon, GAC Toyota; China); Suzuki Swace (estate, Europe, 2020–2025)
- Production: June 2018 – present (hatchback); January 2019 – present (saloon/estate)
- Model years: 2019–present (hatchback); 2020–present (saloon)
- Assembly: Japan: Toyota, Aichi (Takaoka and Tsutsumi plant); Brazil: Indaiatuba (Toyota do Brasil); China: Guangzhou (GAC Toyota); Tianjin (FAW Toyota); Taiwan: Zhongli (Kuozui); Thailand: Chachoengsao (TMT); Turkey: Arifiye (TMMT, saloon only); United Kingdom: Burnaston, Derbyshire (TMUK, hatchback and estate only); United States: Blue Springs, Mississippi (TMMMS, USDM models)
- Designer: Yoshiki Konishi (2016)

Body and chassis
- Class: Compact car/Small family car (C)
- Body style: 4-door saloon/sedan; 5-door hatchback; 5-door estate/station wagon; 5-door panel van (UK only)
- Layout: Front-engine, front-wheel-drive; Front-engine, four-wheel-drive
- Platform: TNGA: GA-C
- Related: Toyota GR Corolla; Toyota C-HR (AX10/50); Toyota Corolla Cross; Toyota Prius (XW50)

Powertrain
- Engine: Petrol: 1.2 L 8NR-FTS VVT-iW turbo I4; 1.2 L 9NR-FTS VVT-iW turbo I4 (China); 1.5 L M15A-FKS VVT-iE I3; 1.5 L M15B-FKS VVT-iE I3 (China); 1.5 L M15C-FKS VVT-iE I3 (China; Levin); 1.6 L 1ZR-FE/1ZR-FAE Dual VVT-i/Valvematic I4; 1.8 L 2ZR-FE/2ZR-FAE Dual VVT-i/Valvematic I4; 2.0 L M20A-FKS I4; 2.0 L M20C-FKS I4 (China; Levin GT); 2.0 L M20E-FKS I4 (China; Allion); Petrol flex-fuel: 1.6 L 1ZR-FBE I4; 1.8 L 2ZR-FBE I4; 2.0 L M20A-FKB I4; Petrol hybrid: 1.8 L 2ZR-FXE I4; 1.8 L 8ZR-FXE I4 (China); 2.0 L M20A-FXS I4
- Transmission: 6-speed EG60 manual; 6-speed EC65 manual; K120 CVT with physical first gear; K313 CVT; Hybrid Synergy Drive (eCVT)
- Hybrid drivetrain: Power-split (hybrid)
- Battery: 1.3 kWh (hybrid)

Dimensions
- Wheelbase: Hatchback (Japanese market): 2,640 mm (103.9 in); Saloon/estate: 2,700 mm (106.3 in); Allion/Levin GT/Levin L; 2,750 mm (108.3 in); Corolla (China 2025+); 2,750 mm (108.3 in)
- Length: Saloon: 4,495 mm (177.0 in) (Japan); 4,630 mm (182.3 in) (international); 4,635 mm (182.5 in) (SE/XSE/GR Sport); 4,640 mm (182.7 in) (Levin); 4,695 mm (184.8 in) (Levin GT / Levin L); 4,710 mm (185.4 in) (China 2025+); 4,720 mm (185.8 in) (Allion); Hatchback: 4,370 mm (172.0 in) (international); 4,375 mm (172.2 in) (Japan); 4,380 mm (172.4 in) (GR Sport); Estate: 4,495 mm (177.0 in) (Japan); 4,650 mm (183.1 in) (international); 4,670 mm (183.9 in) (TREK)
- Width: Saloon: 1,745 mm (68.7 in) (Japan); 1,780 mm (70.1 in) (international); Hatchback: 1,790 mm (70 in); Estate: 1,745 mm (68.7 in) (Japan); 1,790 mm (70 in) (international); 1,805 mm (71.1 in) (TREK)
- Height: 1,420 mm (55.9 in) (SE/XSE Apex); 1,435–1,455 mm (56.5–57.3 in) (international); 1,460 mm (57.5 in) (Japan/TREK)
- Kerb weight: Saloon: 1,290–1,430 kg (2,844–3,153 lb); Hatchback: 1,240–1,510 kg (2,734–3,329 lb); Estate: 1,300–1,560 kg (2,866–3,439 lb)

Chronology
- Predecessor: Toyota Corolla (E160) – saloon (Japan), estate (Japan and Oceania); Toyota Corolla (E170/E180) – saloon (international); Toyota Auris (E180) – hatchback (international), estate (Europe); Toyota Prius (XW50) (Australia & New Zealand)

The Toyota Corolla (E210) is the twelfth generation of the Corolla, a compact car (C-segment) manufactured by Toyota. Introduced in 2018, this generation has also grown to include hatchback and estate (station wagon) configurations in addition to the saloon (sedan).

Since 2022, a high-performance model became available as the GR Corolla. Based on the hatchback model, the GR Corolla is marketed under the Gazoo Racing family of high-performance cars.

Its platform-sharing vehicles include the Toyota Corolla Cross, a compact crossover SUV, and the Toyota C-HR, an SUV with a hatchback-like body.

== Overview ==
The E210 series Corolla was first introduced in 2018 at the Geneva Motor Show. The E210 Corolla is paired with a transverse engine powered by petrol, flex-fuel, or a hybrid of petrol and electric. Developed under the lead of chief engineer Yasushi Ueda, it is the first Corolla to be built on the Toyota New Global Architecture (GA-C) platform shared with the fourth-generation Prius and C-HR. With the GA-C platform, the base of the front windscreen was lowered by 40 mm (1.6 in), the overall height of the dashboard was reduced for styling reasons and improving visibility. The seats are lowered by 25 mm (1.0 in) to maintain the same head clearance as the previous generation.

As of 2020, the twelfth-generation Corolla was the best-selling passenger vehicle in the world with a 1.6% global market share.

== Body styles ==
=== Hatchback ===
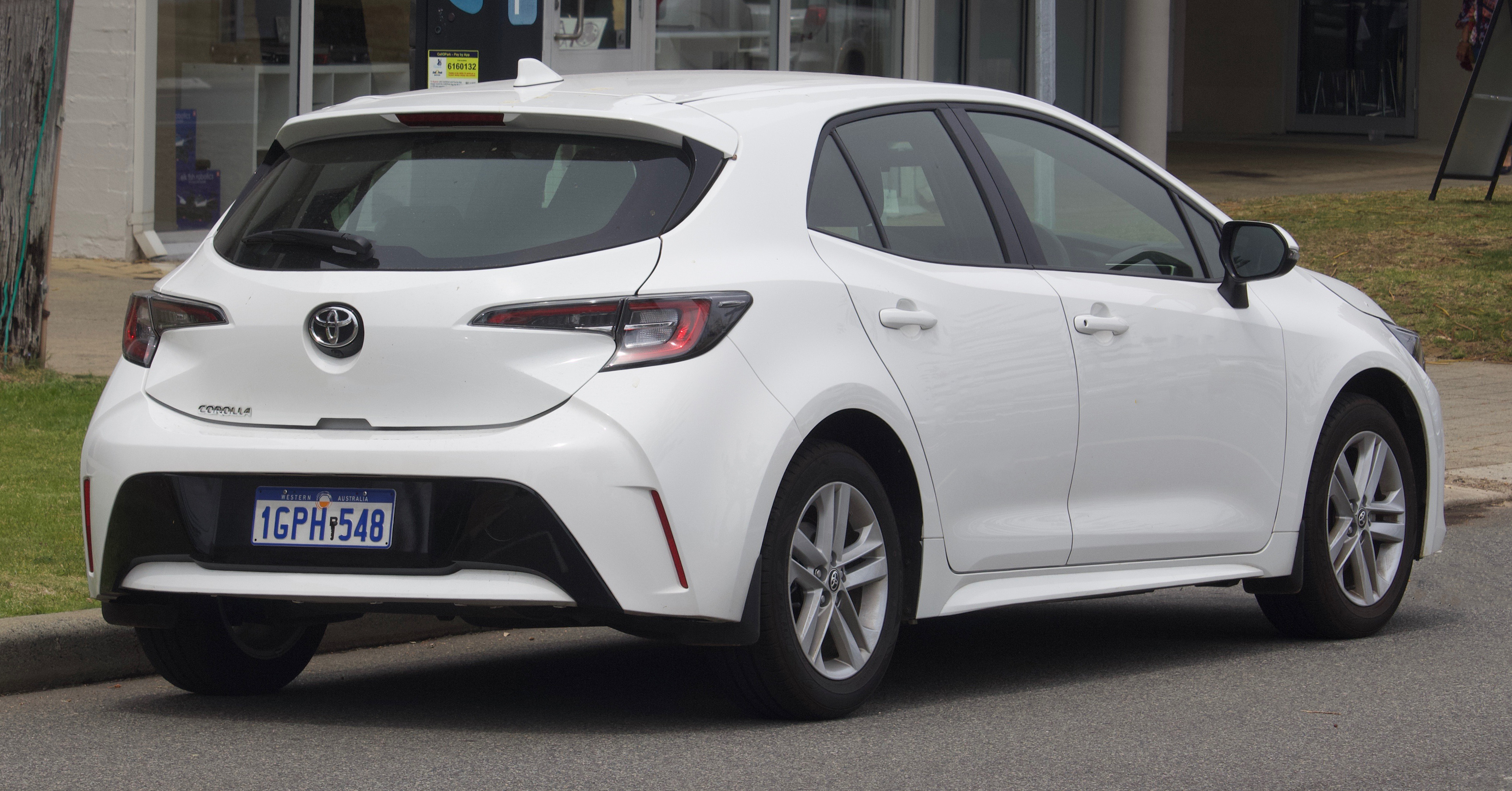
2018 Corolla Ascent Sport hatchback (MZEA12, Australia) (Rear)

The twelfth generation Corolla Hatchback was unveiled as a pre-production model in early March 2018 at the 88th Geneva Motor Show and as a production model on 28 March 2018 at the New York International Auto Show in hatchback body style.

The vehicle was initially branded as the Auris, a nameplate Toyota used historically for Corolla hatchbacks, but had subsequently been phased out. The Auris nameplate was discontinued across Europe in January 2019 and in Taiwan in July 2020. In Japan and in Taiwan (since July 2020), the hatchback is marketed as the Corolla Sport; in other regions it is simply called the Corolla hatchback.

Depending on the country, power for the Corolla hatchback comes from the 1.2-litre 8NR-FTS turbocharged petrol, the 1.8-litre 2ZR-FXE hybrid petrol, the 2.0-litre M20A-FKS Dynamic Force petrol or the 2.0-litre M20A-FXS Dynamic Force hybrid petrol engine.

The Corolla Hatchback is produced in the Tsutsumi Plant in Toyota, Aichi, Japan, and in Toyota Manufacturing UK in Burnaston, United Kingdom for the European market.

=== Saloon ===
The saloon model was unveiled simultaneously between 15 and 16 November 2018 in Carmel-by-the-Sea, California, United States, and in China at the 2018 Guangzhou International Motor Show. This is sold in two versions which are referred to internally as Prestige and Sporty.

==== Prestige ====
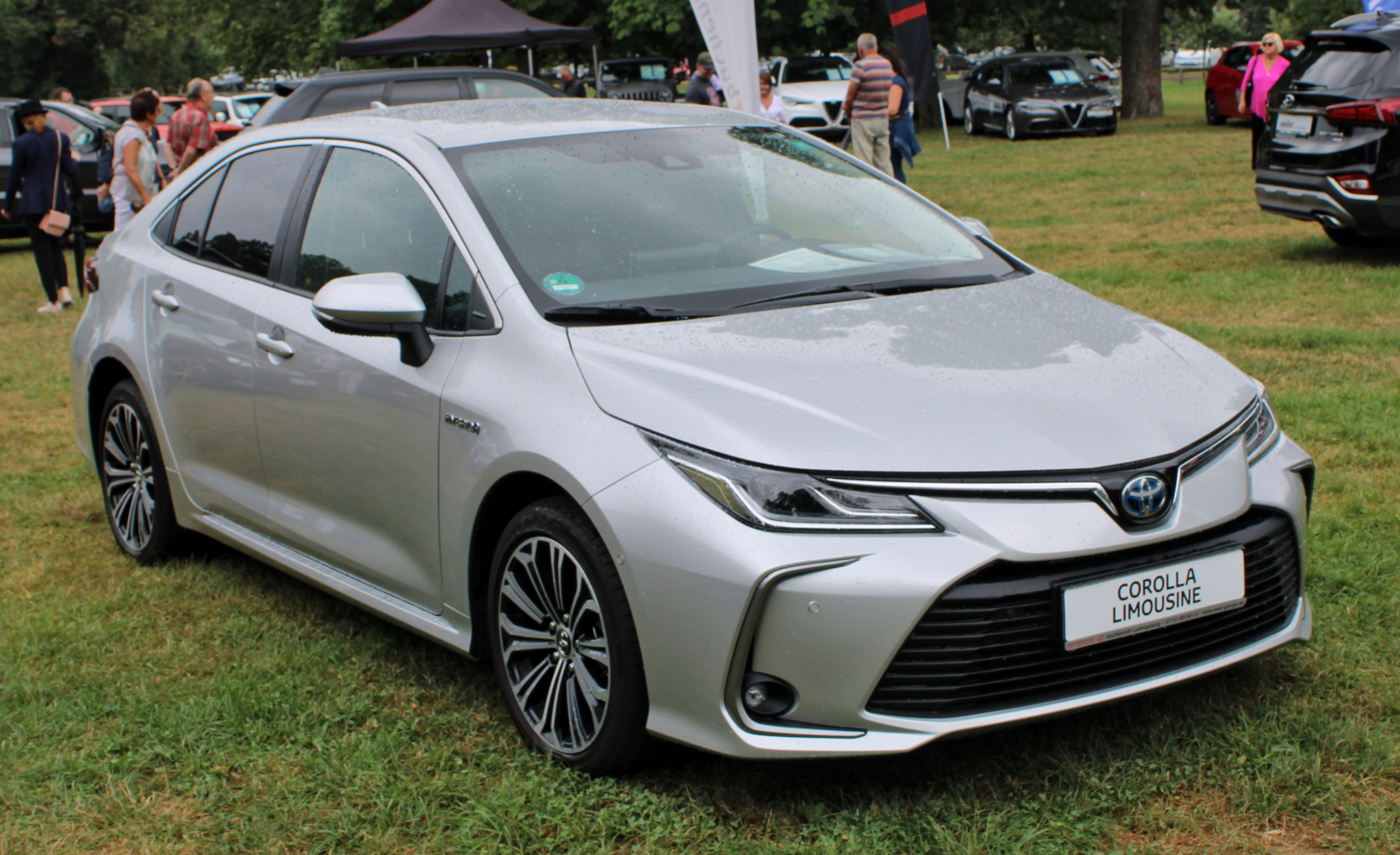

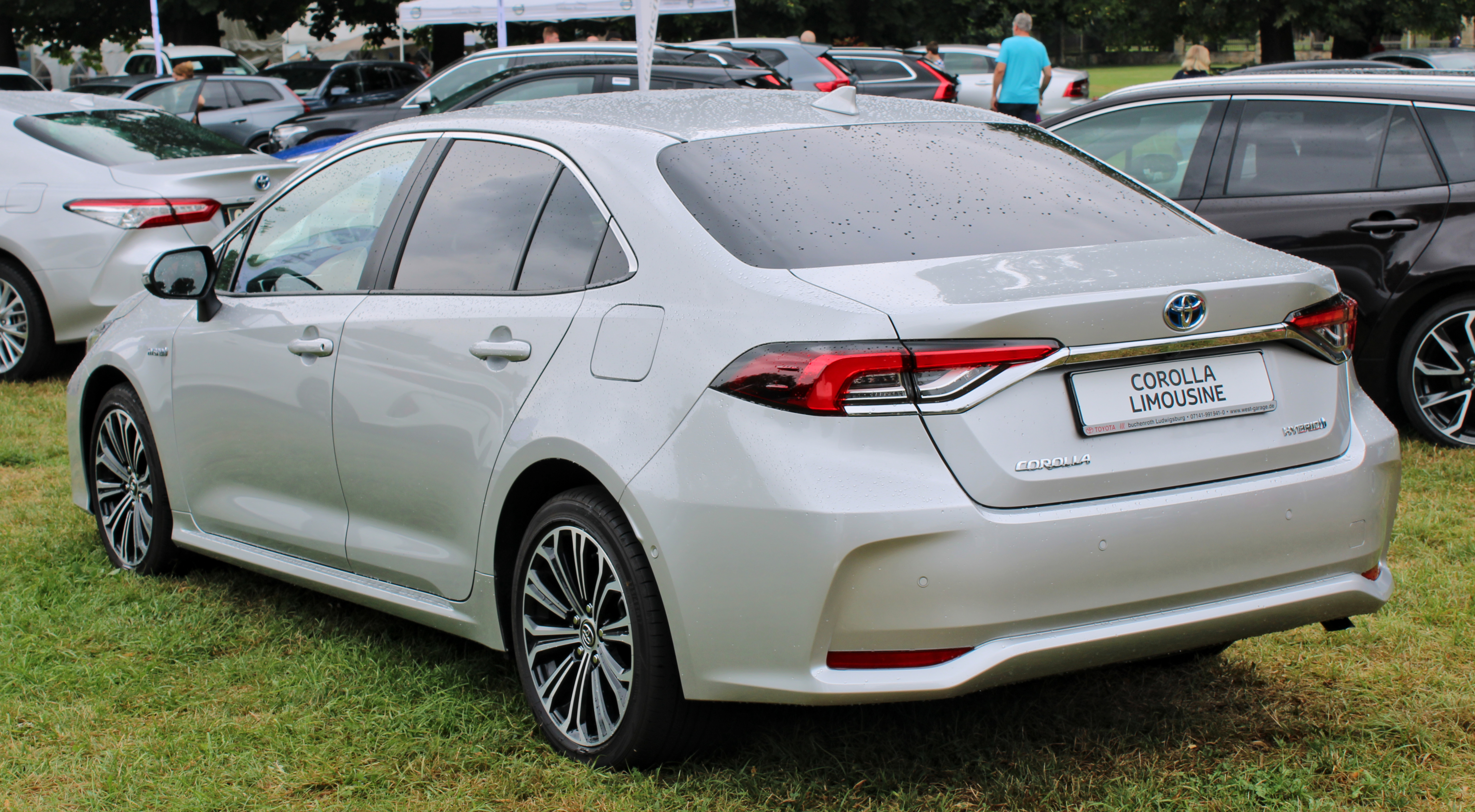
Corolla saloon (International)

The "Prestige" model is sold in China, Taiwan, Europe, Middle East, Africa, South America and Southeast Asia. This uses a different front fascia, which is more similar to the XV70 series Camry, conceived based on a research that customers in these markets prefer a more "prestigious" look for the saloon. The first "Prestige" model saloon rolled off the assembly line at the Sakarya plant in Turkey on 28 January 2019. The "Prestige" model was launched in Turkey on 13 February 2019 and sales began the following day.

The "Prestige" model has been available in certain European countries since March 2019. While there are several engine choices for the Hatchback and Touring Sports, the sole powertrain for the European Corolla saloon is the 1.8-litre hybrid paired with CVT.

In Taiwan and Southeast Asia, the "Prestige" model saloon is sold as the Corolla Altis. In Morocco, it is marketed as the Corolla Prestige. It was launched in Taiwan on 27 March 2019, in Thailand on 3 September 2019, in the Philippines on 9 September 2019, in Indonesia on 12 September 2019, in Malaysia on 9 October 2019, in Brunei on 2 January 2020 and in Singapore on 9 January 2020 at the Singapore Motorshow.

==== Sporty ====
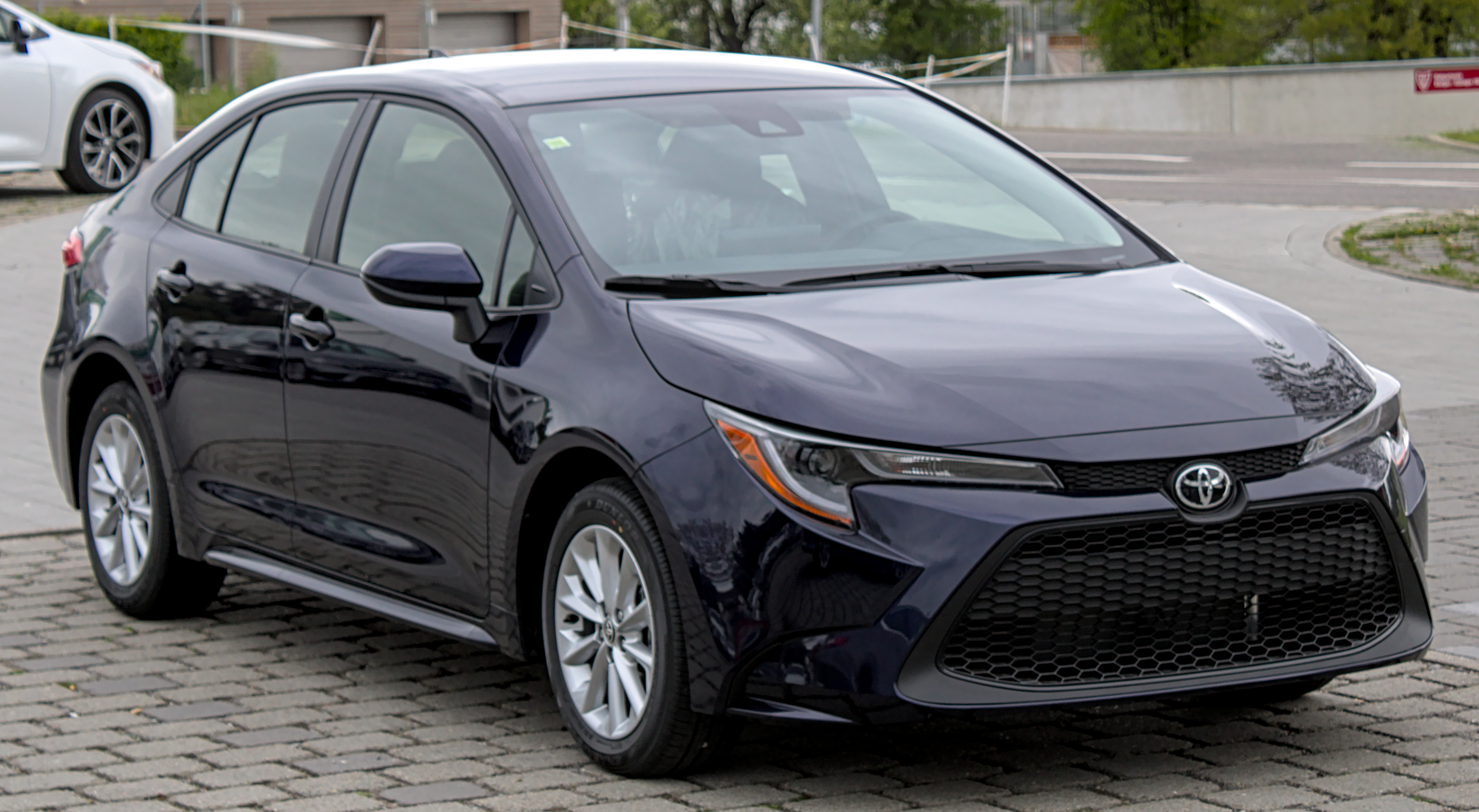

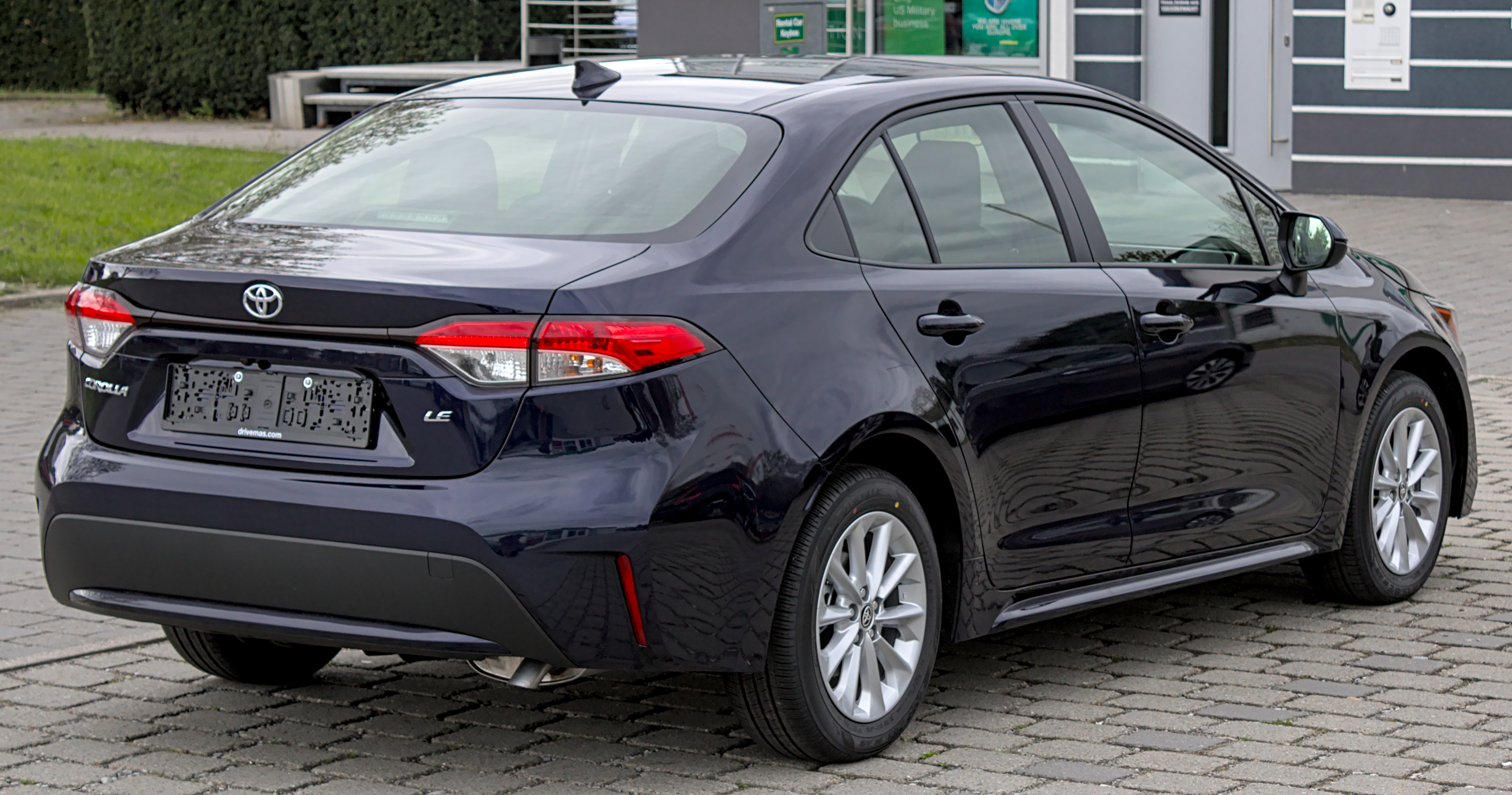
Corolla Sedan (North America)

The "Sporty" model uses a similar front fascia to the hatchback and estate versions. This version is sold in North America, Japan, Australia, South Africa, China (as the Levin (Chinese: 雷凌; pinyin: Léilíng)), and other countries.

The "Sporty" model was launched in Japan on 17 September 2019 with a smaller footprint than its international counterpart.

Depending on the countries, power for the Corolla saloon (E210) comes from a choice of the 1.2-litre 8NR-FTS turbo petrol, 1.8-litre petrol 2ZR-FE, 1.8-litre 2XR-FXE hybrid petrol, or 2.0-litre petrol M20A-FKS.

=== Estate ===
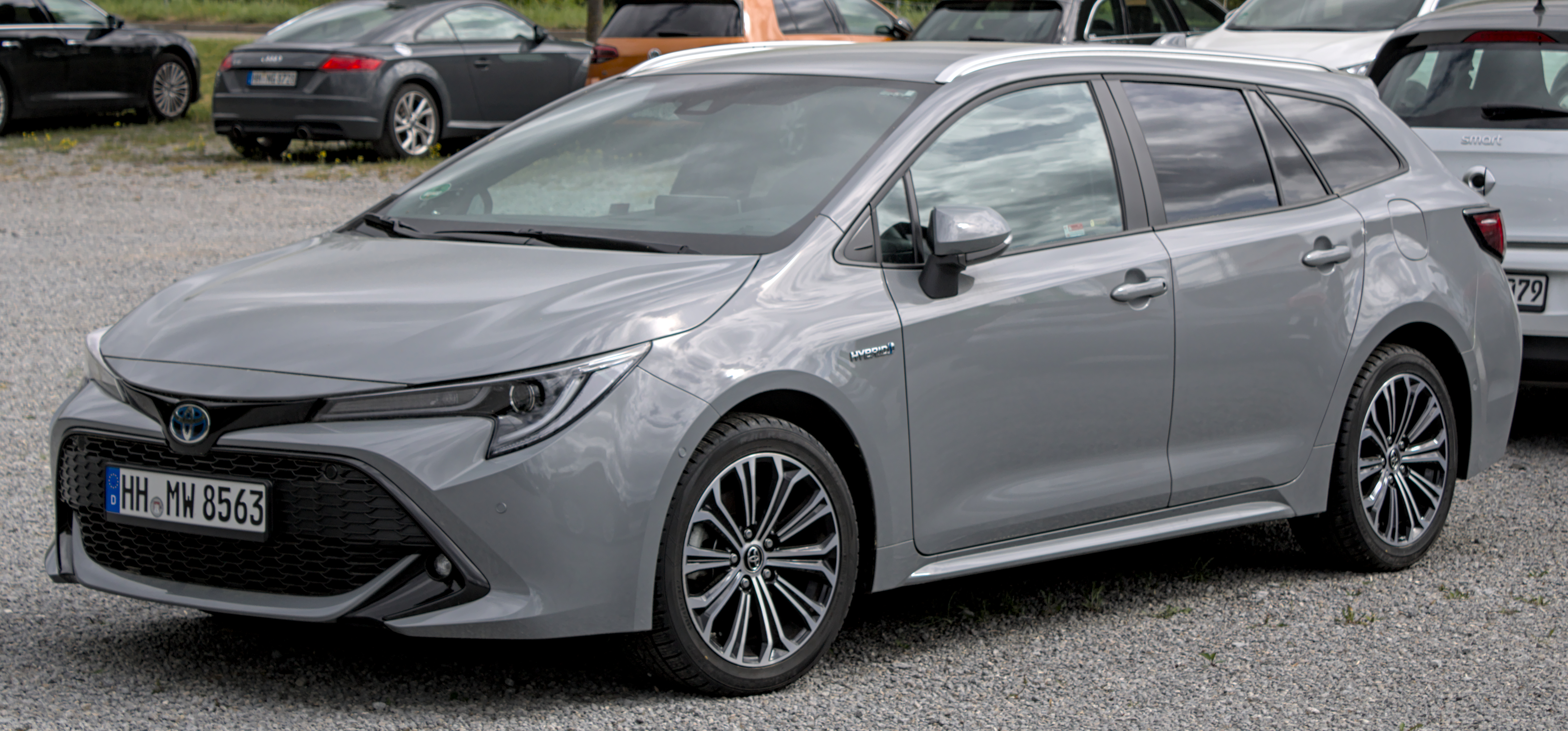
Corolla Touring/Touring Sports (pre-facelift)

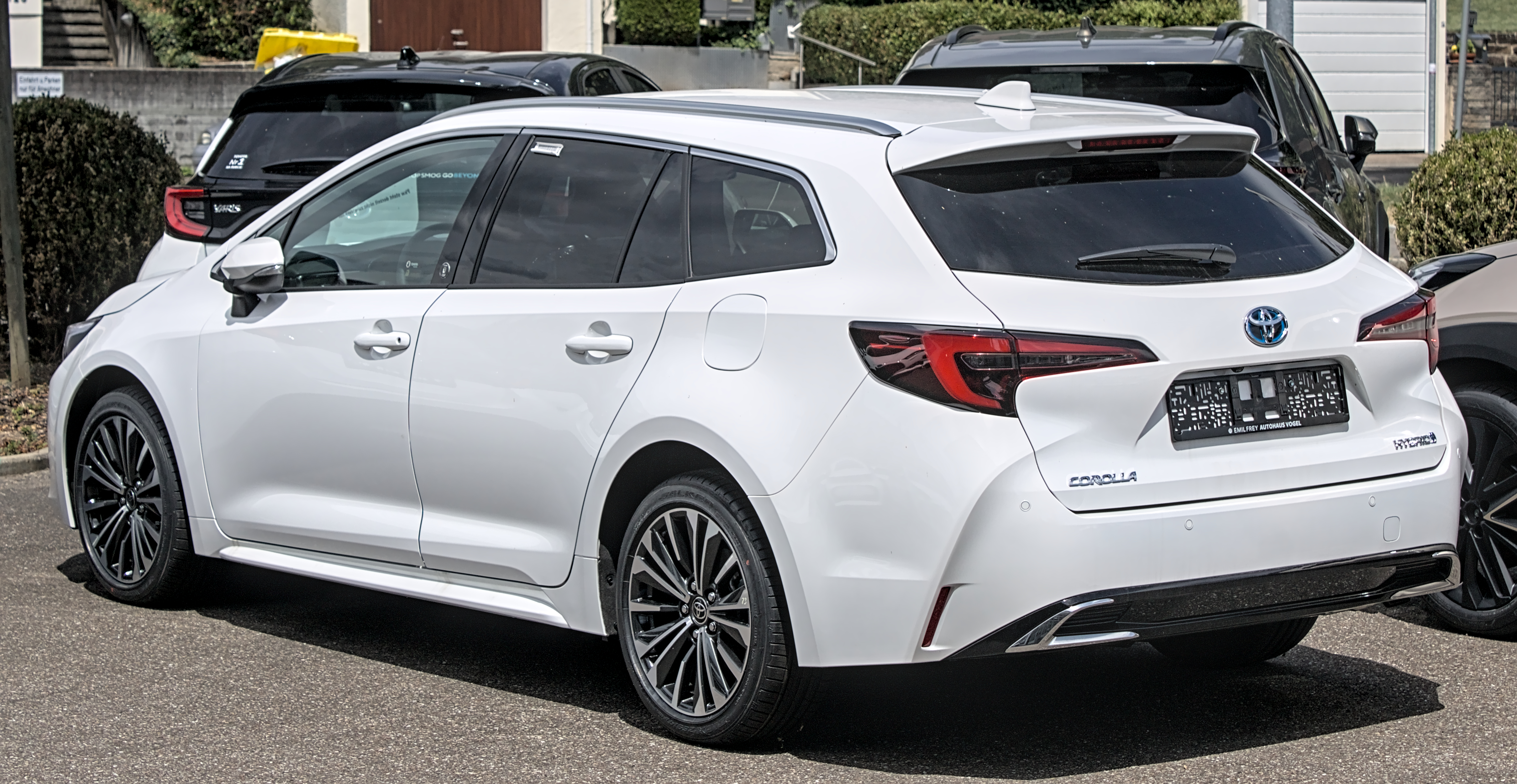
Corolla Touring/Touring Sports (facelift)

The estate or station wagon variation of the Corolla was unveiled at the 2018 Paris Motor Show. The vehicle is branded as the Corolla Touring Sports in most markets, and the Corolla Touring in Japan. The vehicle is not available in American, Australian and Asian (except for Japan) markets including the Chinese market. All components and other elements of the Corolla Touring Sports behind the B-pillar were completely developed in Europe as it is the primary market for the model.

Depending on the country, power for the Corolla Touring Sports comes from the 1.2-litre 8NR-FTS turbocharged petrol engine, the 1.8-litre 2ZR-FAE naturally aspirated petrol engine, the 1.8-litre 2ZR-FXE hybrid petrol engine, or the 2.0-litre M20A-FXS hybrid petrol engine.

Toyota introduced the Corolla Trek version of estate car at the 2019 Geneva Motor Show, with a raised suspension, a roof rack and additional body protection.

Estate models are produced in Toyota Manufacturing UK in Burnaston, United Kingdom for the European market, and in the Tsutsumi Plant in Toyota, Aichi, Japan for the smaller Japanese-market model.

== Markets ==
=== Japan ===
The Corolla hatchback is sold in Japan as the Corolla Sport, which was launched on 27 June 2018. It is sold exclusively at Toyota Corolla Store dealerships. Motive power for the Japanese Corolla Sport comes from the 1.2-litre turbo petrol engine or 1.8-litre Hybrid engine. Trim levels are the base G"X", the mid-level G and the fully loaded G"Z". Intelligent manual transmission is only for the cars with smaller displacement engine. The 1.2-litre cars are also offered with Full-Time 4WD paired with CVT-i. The 2WD G"Z" can be ordered with Adaptive Variable Suspension (AVS) system and Drive Mode Select with Eco, Comfort, Normal, Sport S and Sport S+ modes.

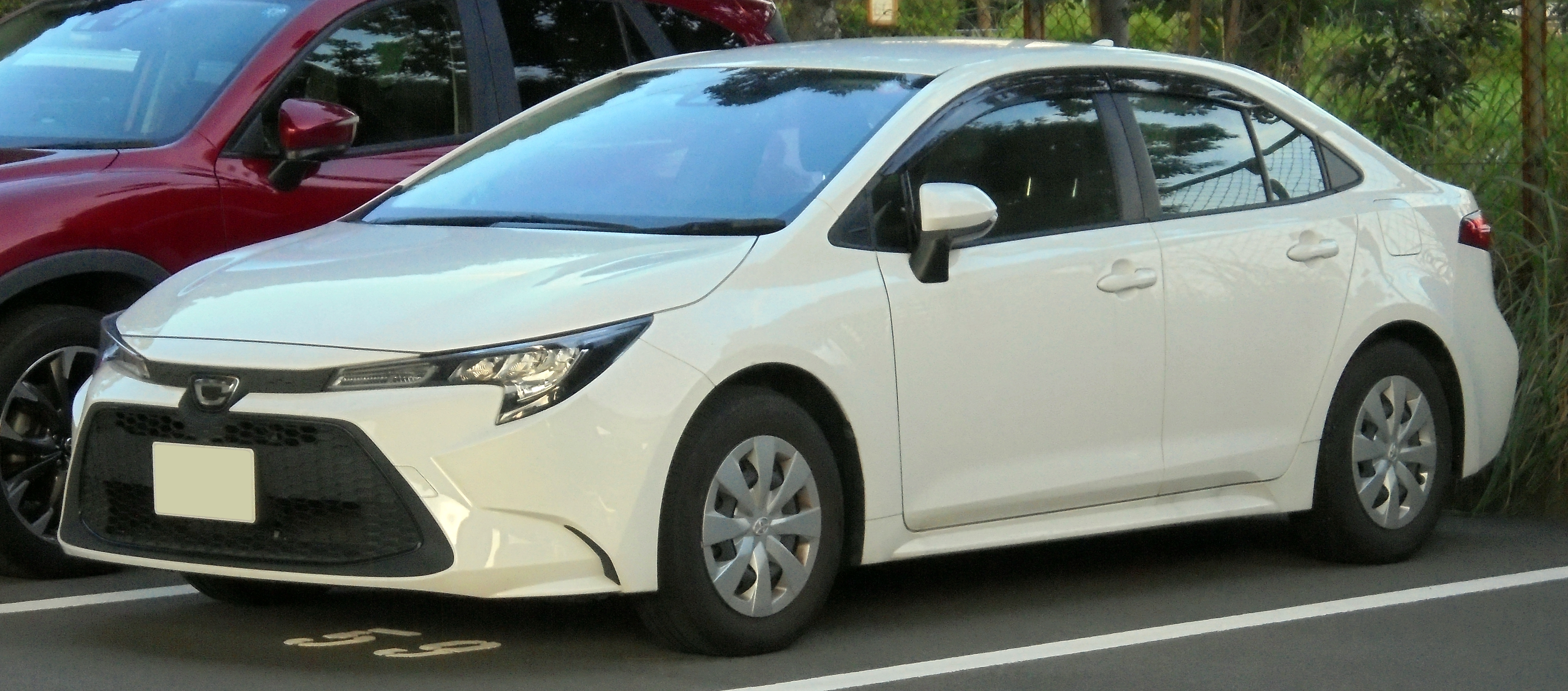
2019–2022 Corolla G-X saloon (ZRE212, Japan)

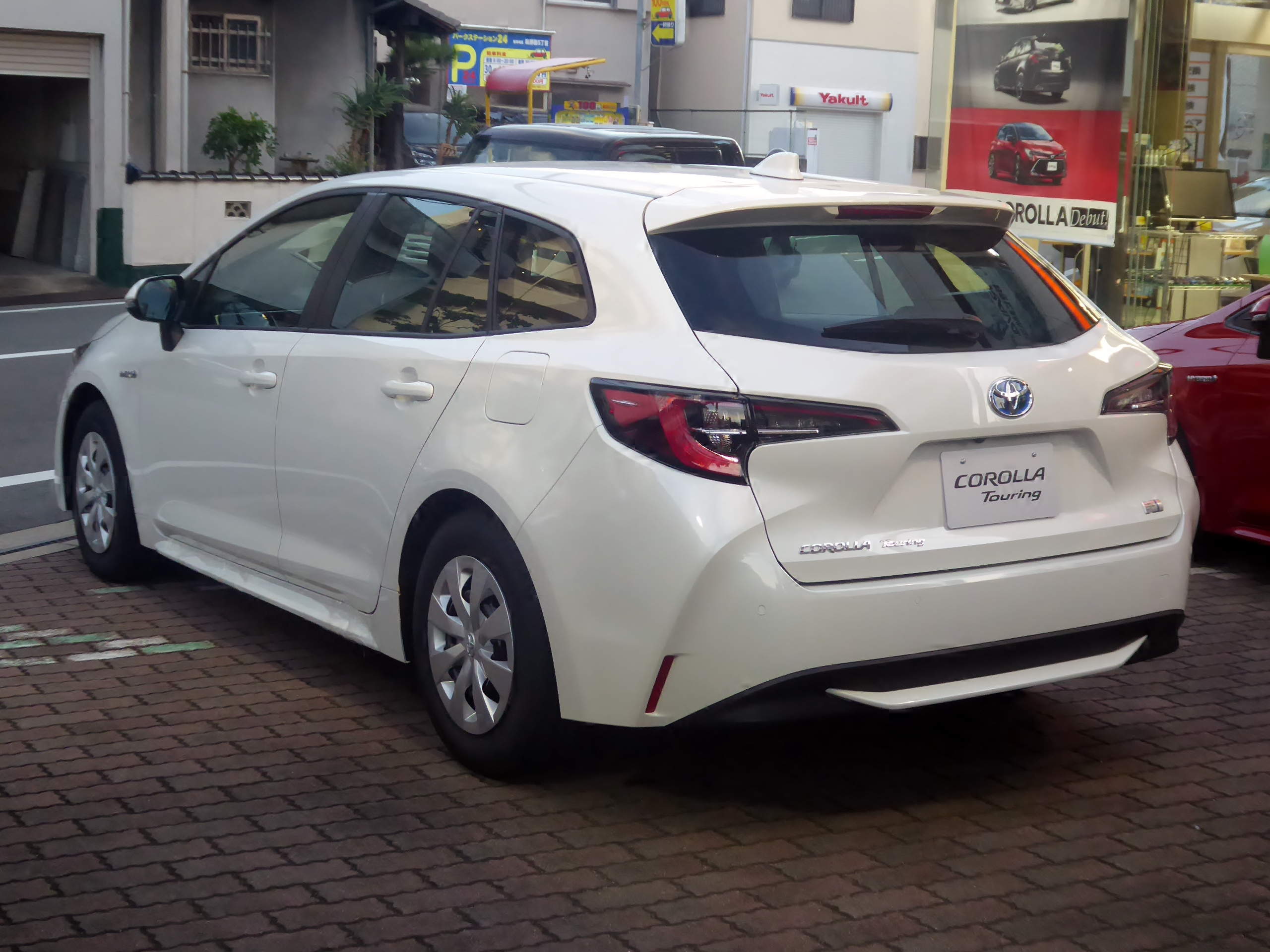
Corolla Touring Hybrid G-X (ZWE211W, Japan)

Both the Corolla saloon and Corolla Touring were launched in Japan on 17 September 2019. It is shorter in length by 135–145 mm (5.3–5.7 in) and narrower by 45–55 mm (1.8–2.2 in) than the global Corolla models. They both share the same wheelbase as the Corolla hatchback (Sport in Japan), contrary to the global Corolla. As the result, both the Japanese market Corolla saloon and Corolla Touring have a minimum turning radius of 5 m (16.4 ft). The bonnet panel, door windows, rear windscreen, doors, bumpers, and the roof stamping had to be redesigned for the Japanese model. The angle of the door mirrors was readjusted to fold closer to the body in order to fit in a narrow garage or parking space. The Japanese market Touring uses the same front fascia as the "Sporty" saloon.

Trim levels for the Japanese market Corolla saloon and Touring are the base G-X, the mid-level S and the fully loaded W×B. Powertrain options are the 1.8-litre petrol engine with CVT (for all trim levels), 1.8-litre Hybrid engine with either 2WD or E-Four (for all trim levels) and 1.2-litre turbo petrol engine with manual transmission (for W×B trim only).

In May 2020, the "2000 Limited" variant of the Touring was released. It is powered by the 2.0-litre M20A-FKS engine (the first 2.0-litre engine option for the Japanese market Corolla) paired with a CVT with ten-speed simulated gear, and had a limited production of 500 units. The "Active Ride" variant with the same engine and production units was released in April 2021.

Excluding the Corolla Rumion, the E210 series of the Corolla is the first to be sold in the Japanese market in which the exterior width (1,745 mm (68.7 in) for the saloon and estate car, and 1,790 mm (70.5 in) for the hatchback) exceeds Japanese government regulations concerning small size passenger vehicles (class five) exterior dimensions and engine displacement.

=== Brazil ===
The E210 Corolla saloon was launched in September 2019, and included an Altis trim with the first version of a flex-fuel hybrid powered by a 1.8-litre Atkinson engine. All the other trims, GLi, XEi and Altis, are powered by a 2.0-litre M20A-FKB flex-fuel engine. The Corolla is produced in the Indaiatuba, São Paulo plant, and initially only 5% of production was devoted to the Altis flex-fuel hybrid with the hybrid powertrain being imported from Japan. However, by February 2020, and despite production constraints, sales of the Corolla Altis flex-fuel hybrid reached almost 25% sales of the country's entire Corolla line-up. In 2021, Toyota launched the GR-S version in the Brazilian market, with the same design as the Taiwanese Corolla Altis GR Sport, powered by the 2.0-litre M20A-FKB engine.

=== China ===
For the mainland China market, excluding Hong Kong and Macao, the E210 series Corolla saloon is available in two different styles. The "Prestige" Corolla is produced and sold by FAW Toyota, whereas the "Sporty" model called Levin is produced and sold by GAC Toyota. Both the Corolla and the Levin are offered as regular petrol, Hybrid and Plug-in Hybrid versions. Both were released in China on 8 August 2019.

The hybrid versions of Corolla and Levin are sold with additional "Shuāngqíng" (Chinese: 双擎; lit. 'dual engine') name to differentiate from the petrol versions. The Levin with 1.2-litre 9NR-FTS petrol engine is named "185T", as it produces 185 N⋅m (136 lb⋅ft) of maximum torque.

The Corolla is offered in Pioneer, Elite, Deluxe, Sport, and Ultimate trim levels. Trim levels for the Levin are Progressive, Deluxe, Sports, Technology, and Premium. The Sports trim has the same front bumper design as the North American Corolla SE/XSE models, while the others have the same front bumper design as the regular "Sporty" Corolla.

In November 2020, the long-wheelbase derivatives were revealed as the Allion (Chinese: 亚洲狮; pinyin: Yàzhōushī; lit. 'Asian Lion', originally "傲澜" (pinyin: Àolán); the change was made because the latter name may sound offensive to Teochew dialect speakers) and the Levin GT (Chinese: 凌尚; pinyin: Língshàng). The Allion is based on the "Prestige" Corolla with several changes to the front fascia and manufactured by FAW Toyota, while the Levin GT is based on the "Sporty" Corolla and manufactured by GAC Toyota. The wheelbase is stretched to 2,750 mm (108.3 in) or 50 mm (2.0 in) longer than the standard Corolla/Levin, while its body length is stretched to 4,720 mm (185.8 in). It is an attempt to occupy a popular segment between the Corolla and the Camry, which is called "A+ class sedan" segment in China.

In January 2021, the 1.5-litre M15B-FKS and M15C-FKS engine options were added.

Available powertrain options include:

- 1.2 L 9NR-FTS straight four-cylinder (I4) turbocharged petrol engine, 86 kW (117 PS), 185 N⋅m (136.5 lb⋅ft) (regular models, with CVT)
- 1.5 L M15B-FKS straight three-cylinder (I3) petrol engine
- 1.5 L M15C-FKS straight three-cylinder (I3) petrol engine (Levin)
- 1.8 L 8ZR-FXE straight four-cylinder (I4) petrol engine with Hybrid Synergy Drive system, 90 kW (123 PS), 142 N⋅m (105 lb⋅ft) (hybrid models, with eCVT)
- 2.0 L M20C-FKS straight four-cylinder (I4) petrol engine, 131 kW (178 PS), 210 N⋅m (150 lb⋅ft) (Levin GT, with CVT)
- 2.0 L M20E-FKS straight four-cylinder (I4) petrol engine, 131 kW (178 PS), 210 N⋅m (150 lb⋅ft) (Allion, with CVT)
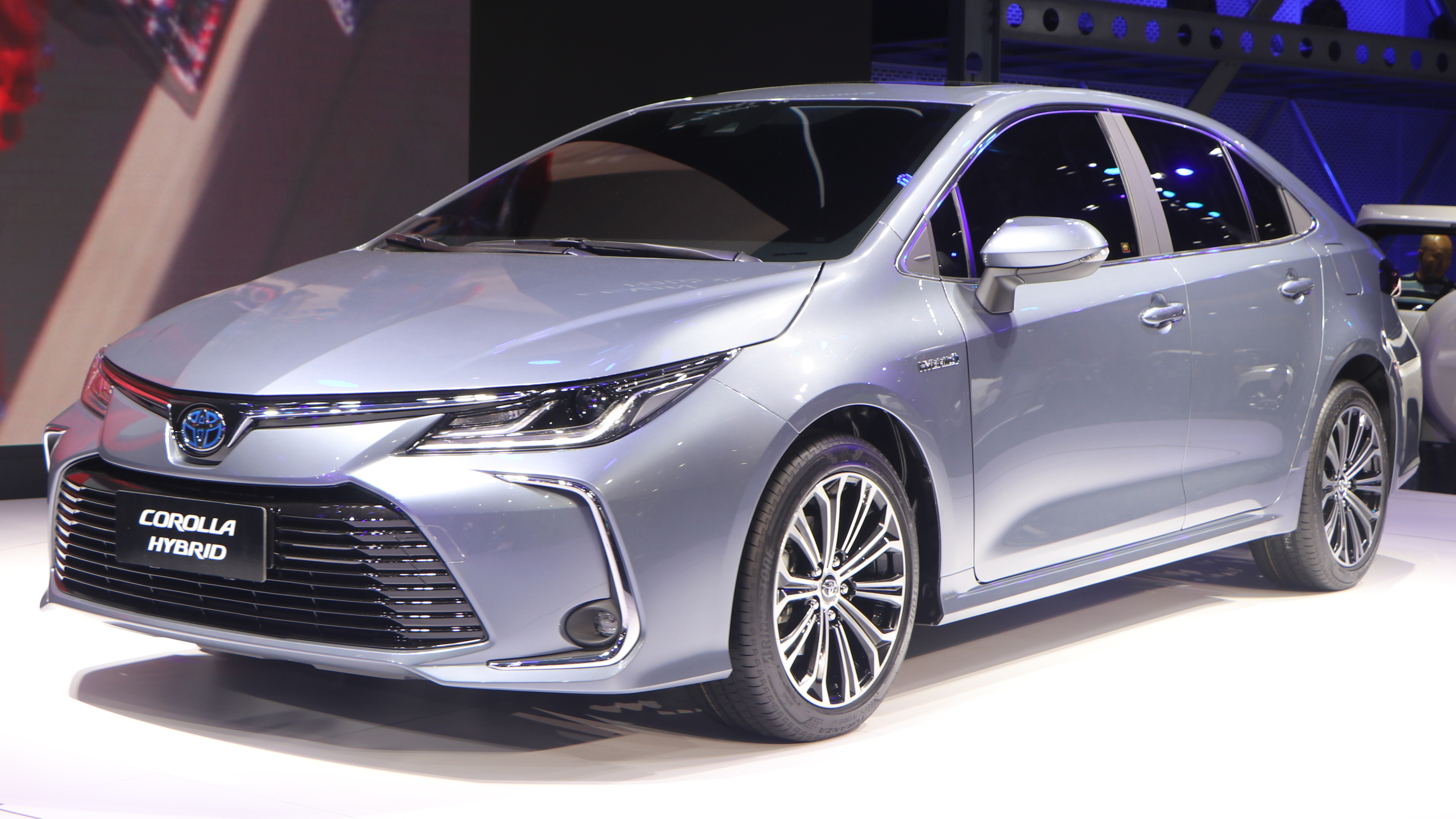
FAW-Toyota Corolla Hybrid (China)

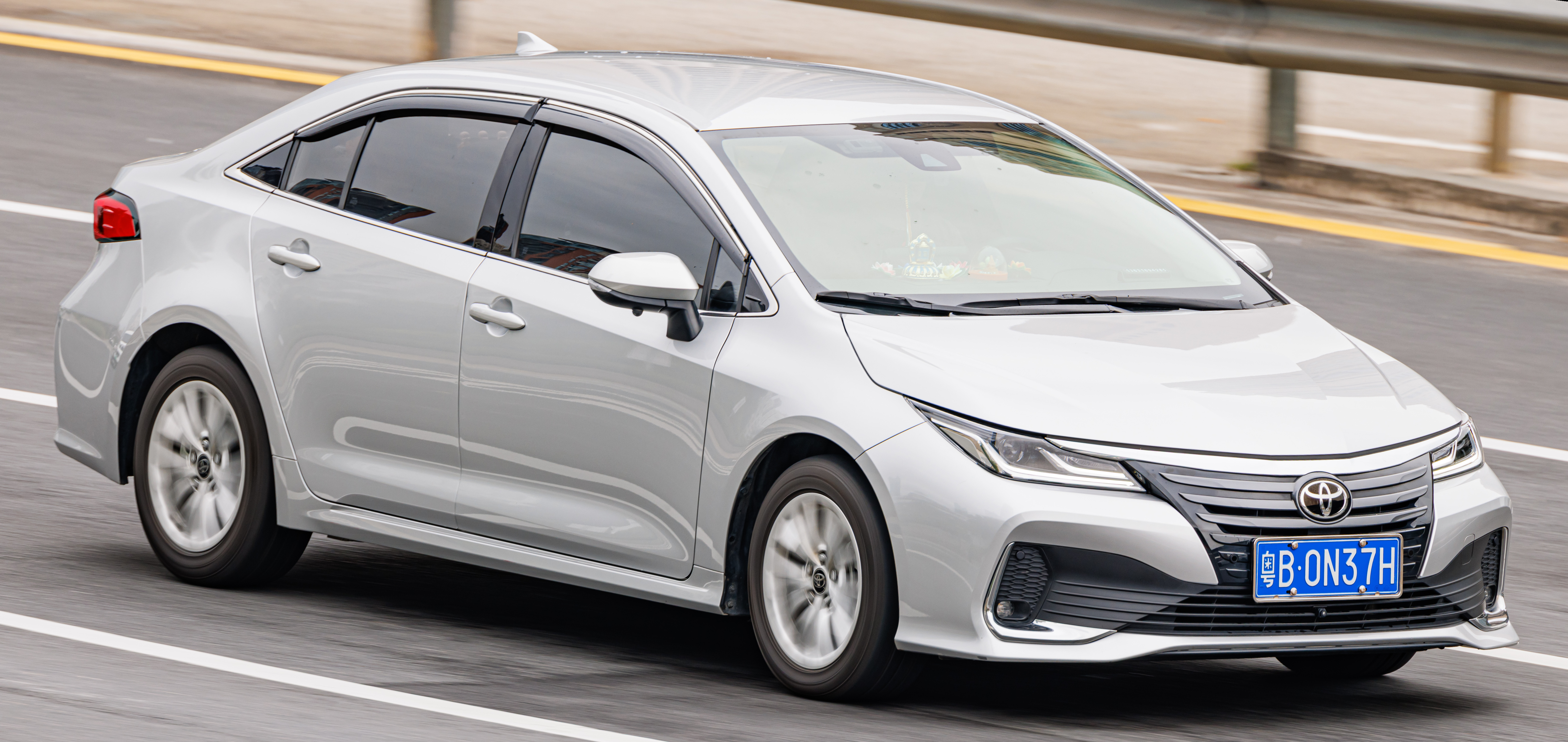
FAW-Toyota Allion (China)

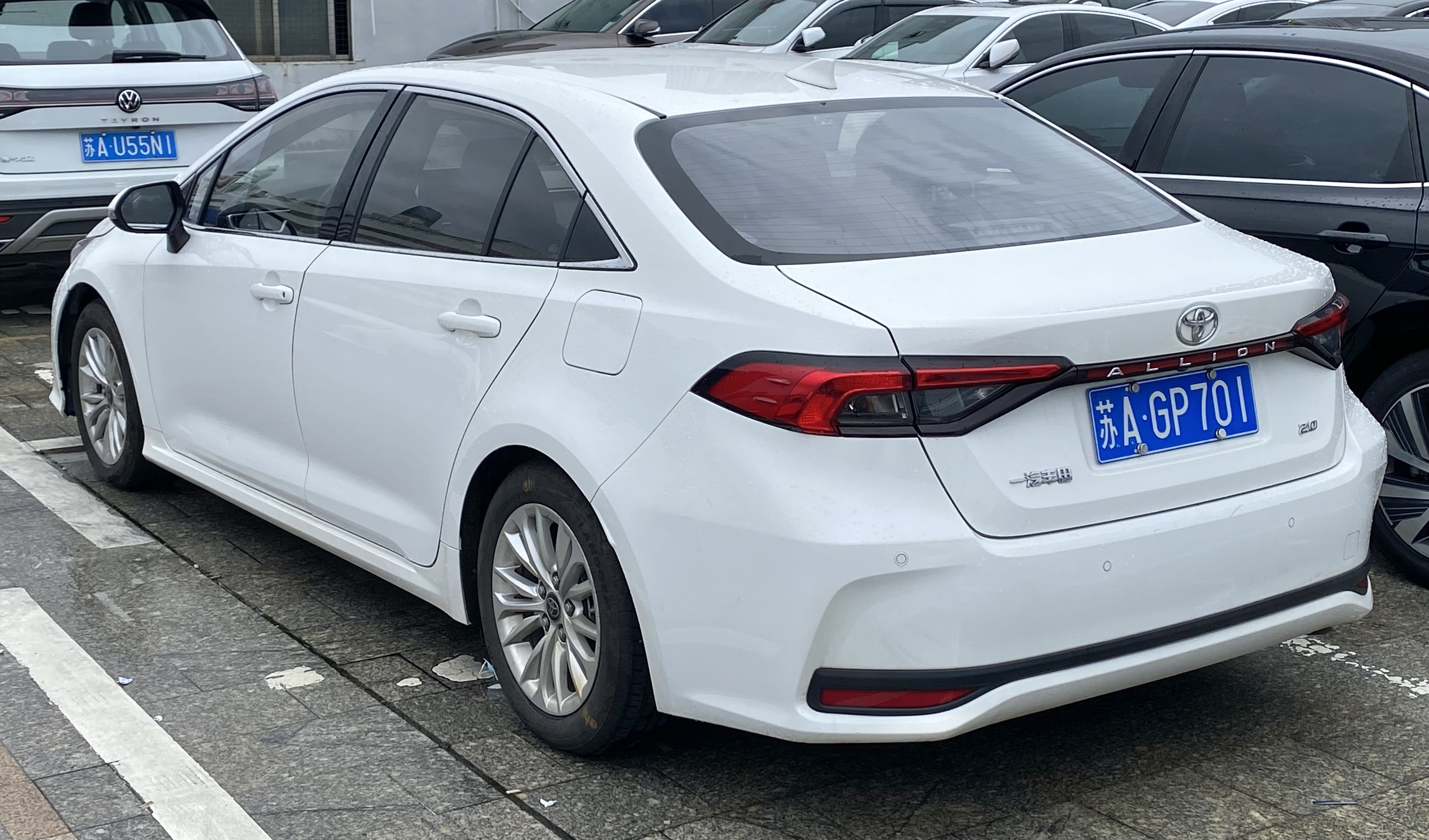
FAW-Toyota Allion (China)

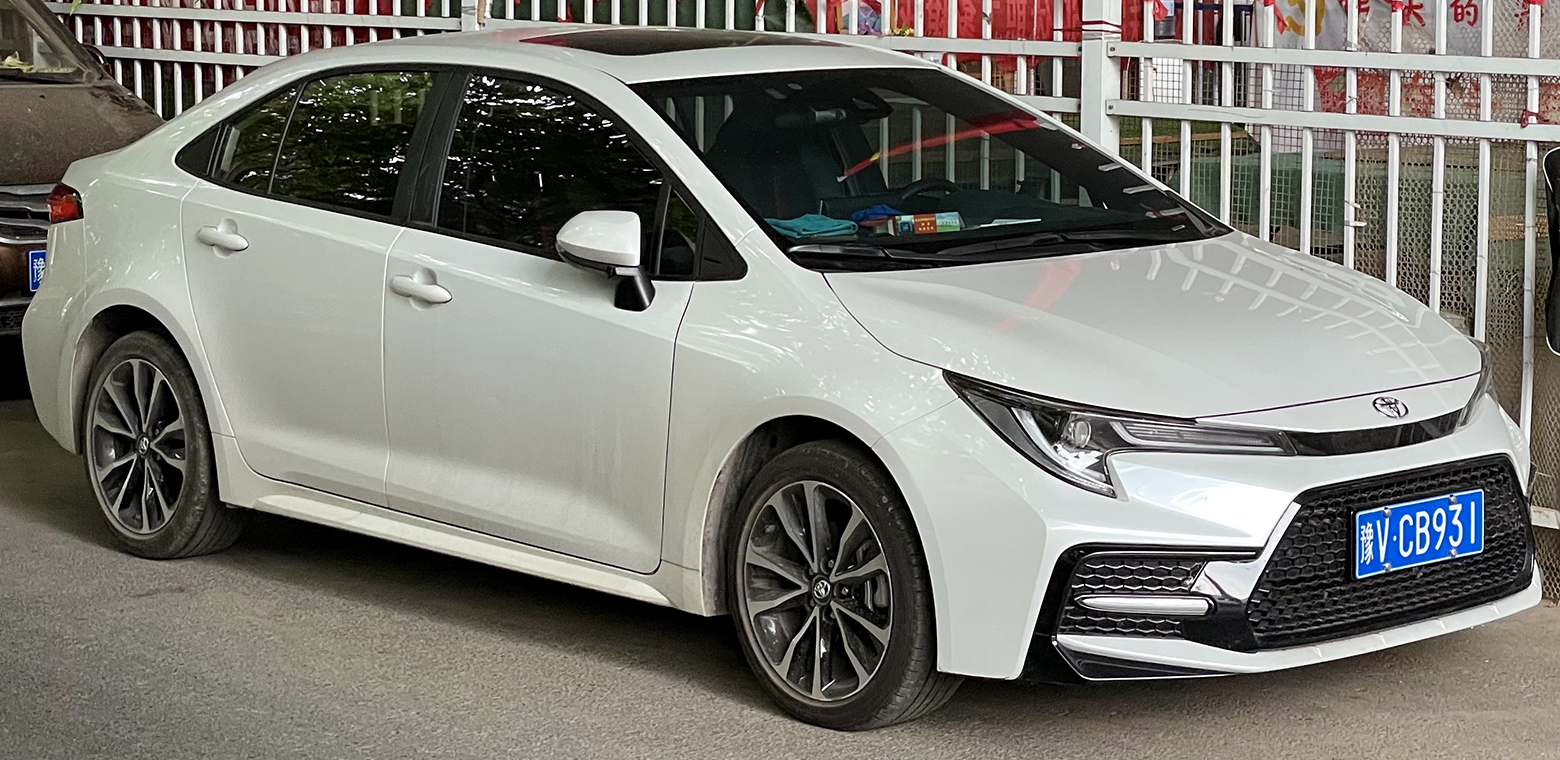
GAC-Toyota Levin Sport (China)

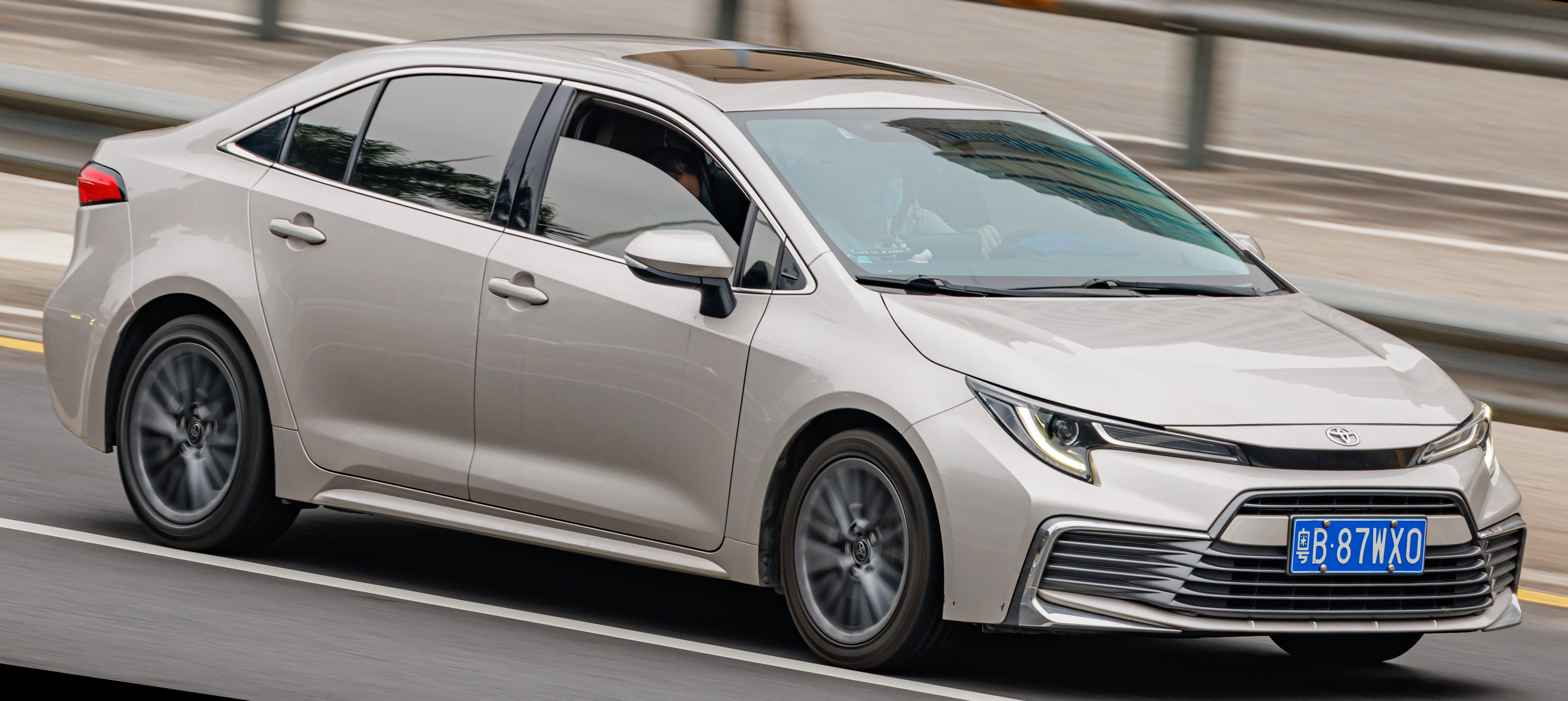
GAC-Toyota Levin GT (China)

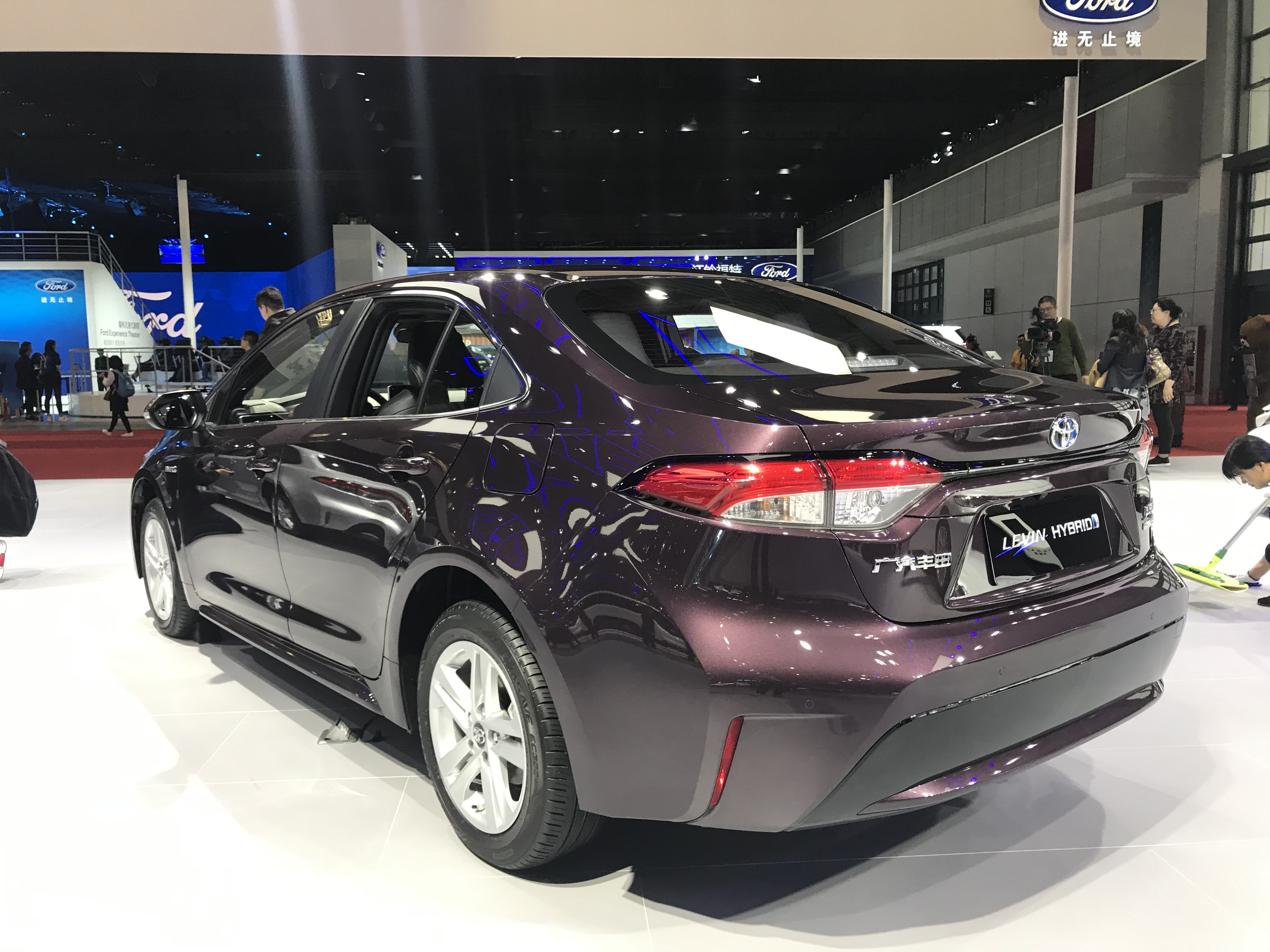
GAC-Toyota Levin Hybrid (China)

=== Europe ===
The twelfth-generation Corolla (E210) for the European market was unveiled at the 2018 Geneva Motor Show. The hatchback and estate (Touring Sports) variants were later revealed at the 2018 Paris Motor Show. Production of the European market Corolla hatchback began on 14 January 2019. Sales began in the UK in February 2019 and across Europe in March 2019.

Initially the new model was due to be marketed as the Auris (third generation), based on the Toyota New Global Architecture (TNGA) platform. In January 2019, shortly after production, the Auris name was discontinued, with the production model reverting back to the Corolla for the European market after a 12-year hiatus.

The hatchback and estate (Touring Sports) variants are built at the Toyota Burnaston factory in the UK.

The saloon variant is built in Turkey and marked the European return of the conventional four-door body shape Corolla after the Corolla (E120) generation. It is only offered in selected European countries (the UK, Ireland, Portugal, Spain, Belgium, Germany, Czech Republic, Slovakia, Hungary, Finland, Poland, Cyprus, and all across the Balkans and Caucasus). The Saloon variant was discontinued in the UK after the 2023 facelift.

Diesel engines were not offered in Europe due to stricter emissions regulations. All non-hybrid engines were discontinued in the UK from 2020. The following engine configurations were offered, not all models were available in all markets:

- 1.2-litre turbocharged petrol (8NR-FTS) with 85 kW (116 PS; 114 hp).
- 1.8-litre hybrid petrol (2ZR-FXE) with 72 kW (98 PS; 97 hp) on the Atkinson-cycle internal combustion engine. The total output depends on the Hybrid Synergy Drive generation.
  - HSD Gen 4 (2018-2022) offered a combined power of 90 kW (122 PS; 121 hp).
  - The newer HSD Gen 5 (2023-) has a more powerful electric motor/generator, producing a combined output of 103 kW (140 PS; 138 hp).
- 2.0-litre Dynamic Force hybrid petrol (M20A-FXS) with 144 kW (196 PS; 193 hp)
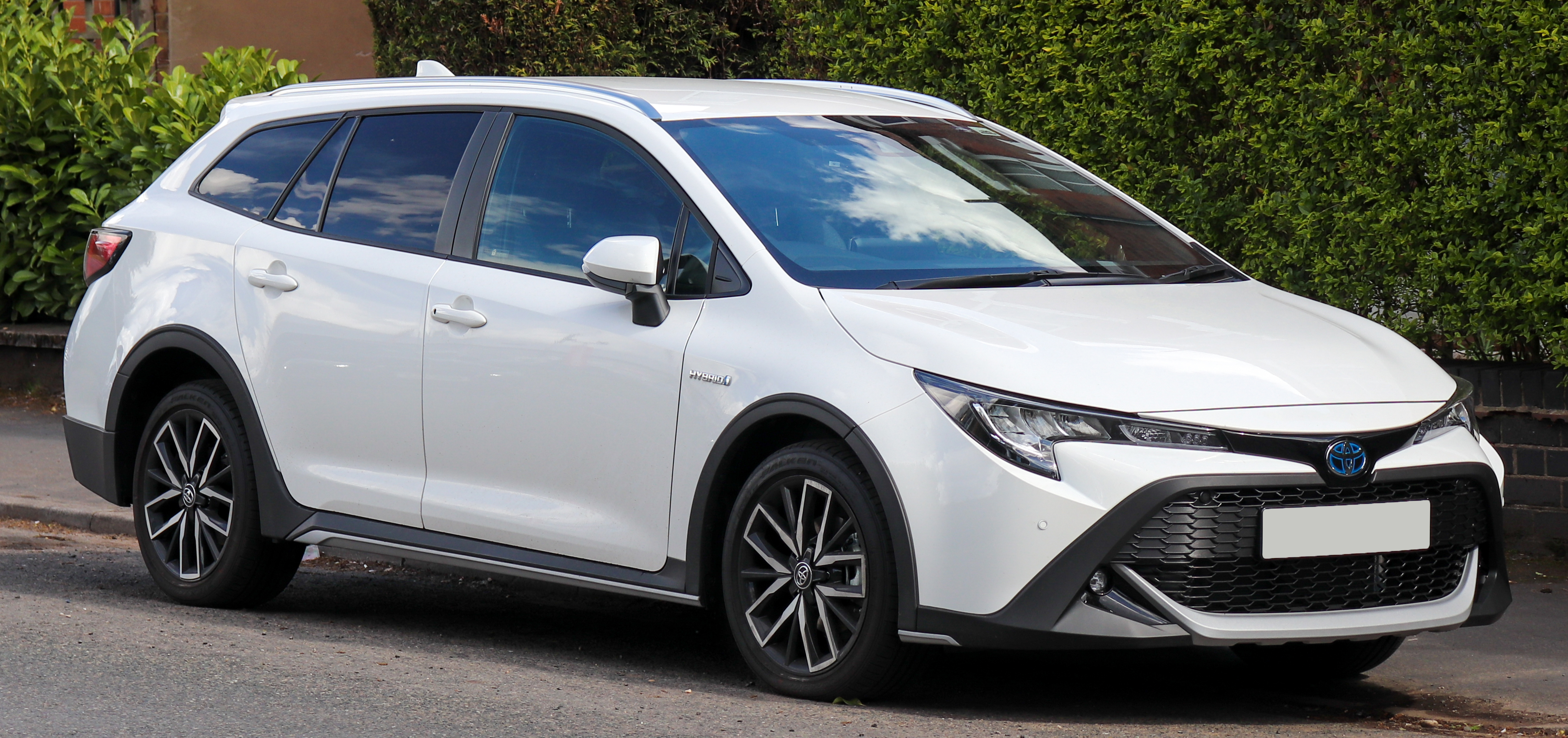
Corolla Trek Hybrid (pre-facelift, UK)

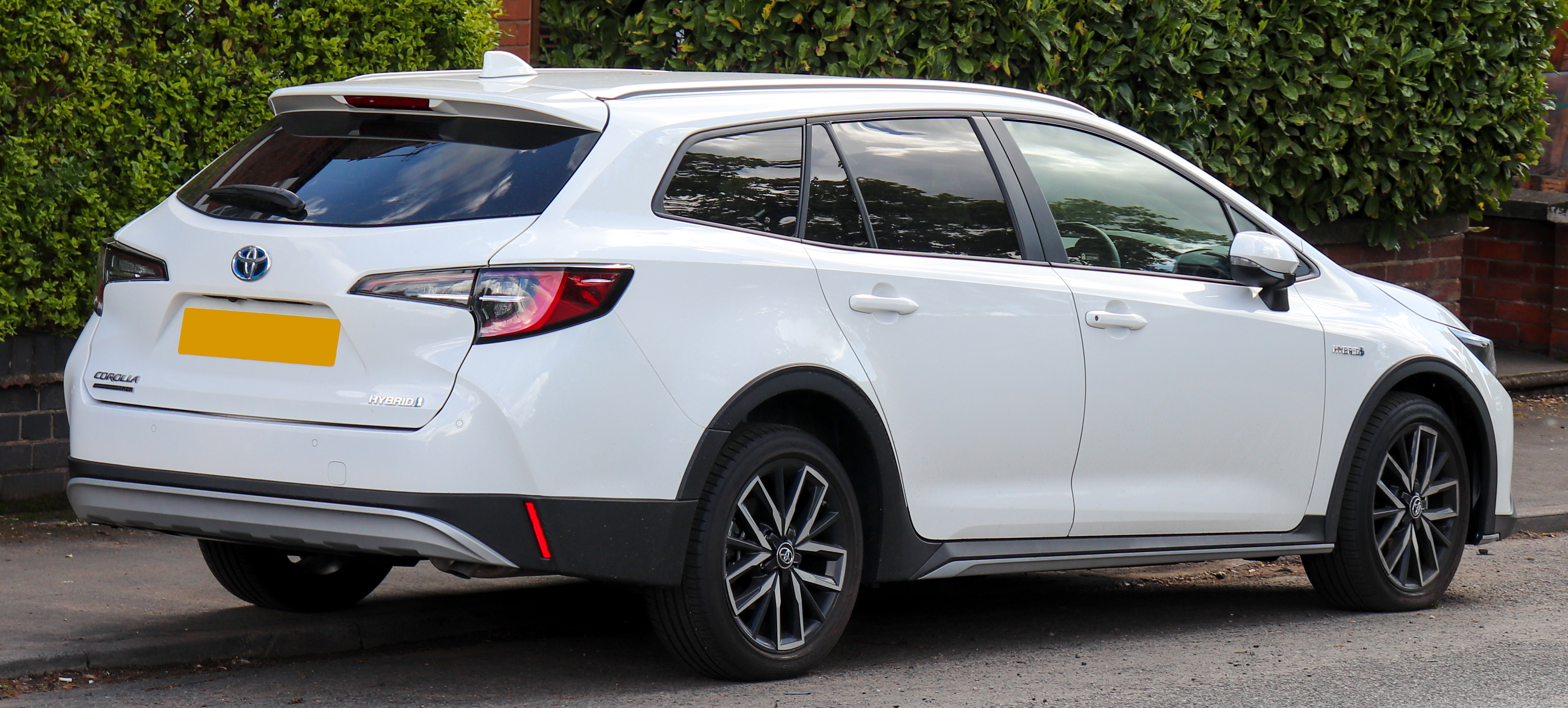
Corolla Trek Hybrid (pre-facelift, UK)

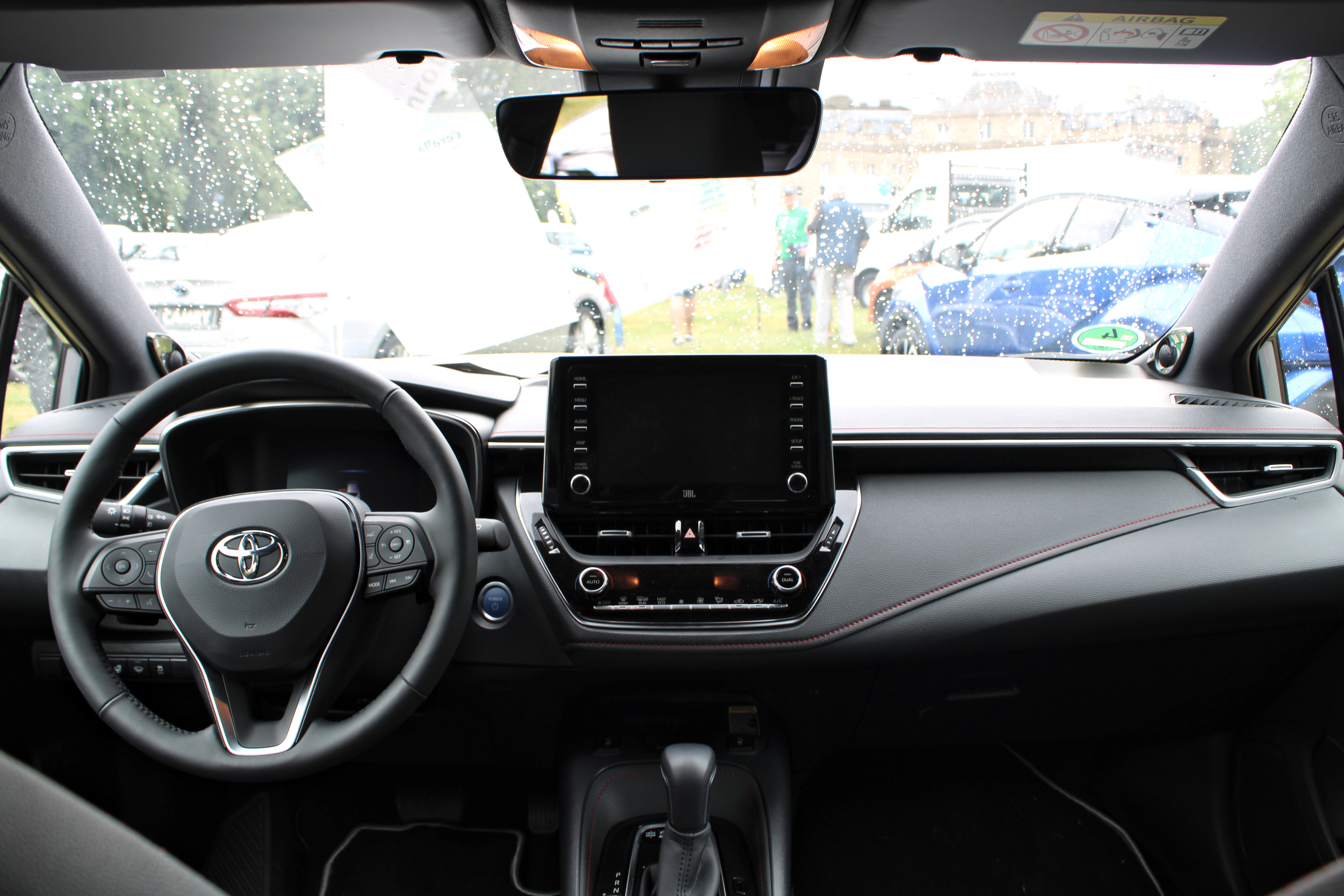
Interior (pre-facelift)

==== Suzuki Swace ====
The Suzuki-badged version called Suzuki Swace was introduced in September 2020. It is based on the Corolla estate with 1.8-litre hybrid engine and sold in Europe only.

In February 2023, the Suzuki Swace received power and technology upgrades following the recent facelift of its twin, the Toyota Corolla Touring Sports.

In 2025, Suzuki discontinued production of the Swace in Europe, along with the Ignis, Jimny and Swift Sport. The company cites a shift in focus to electric vehicles as the reason for discontinuation.

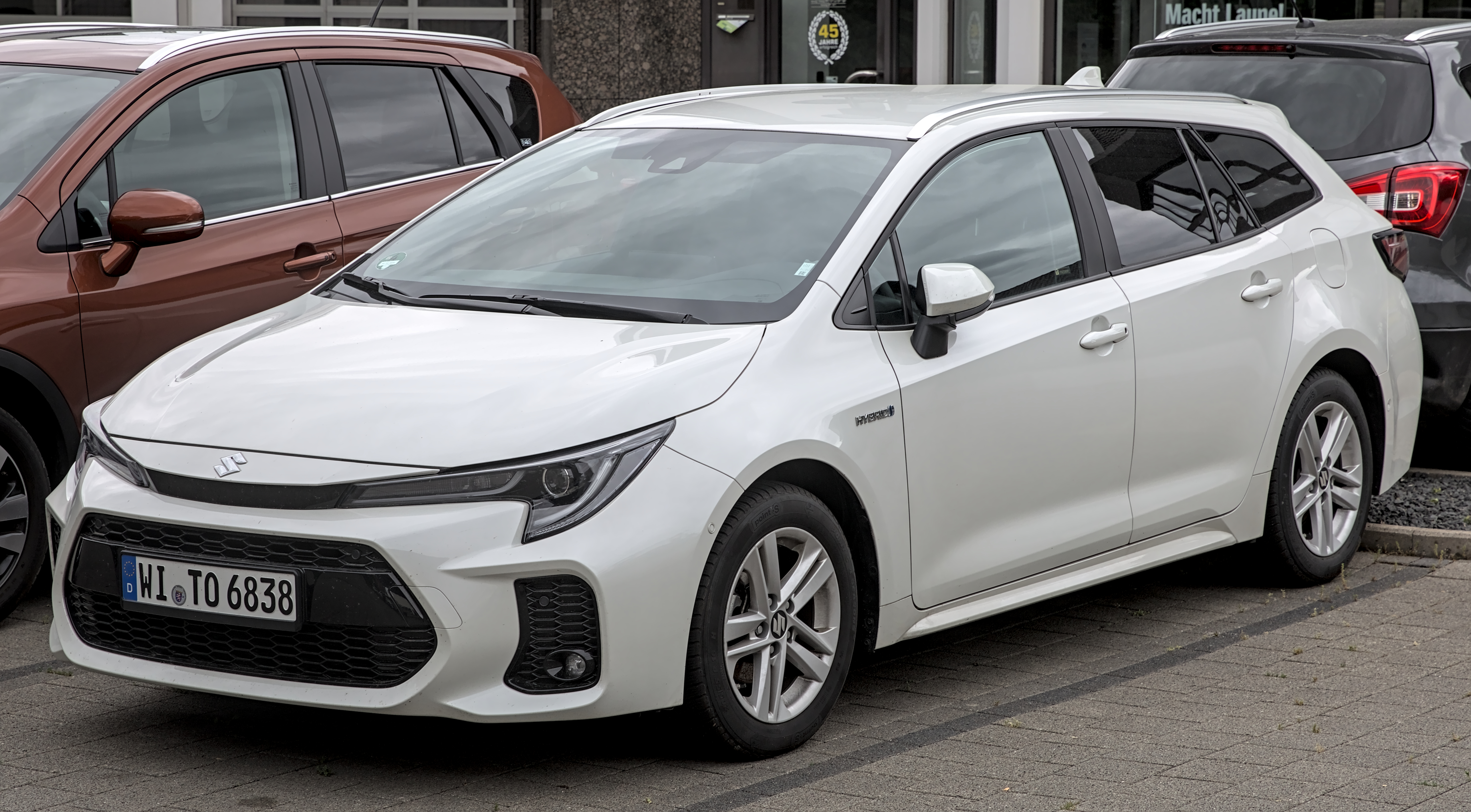
Suzuki Swace (Europe)

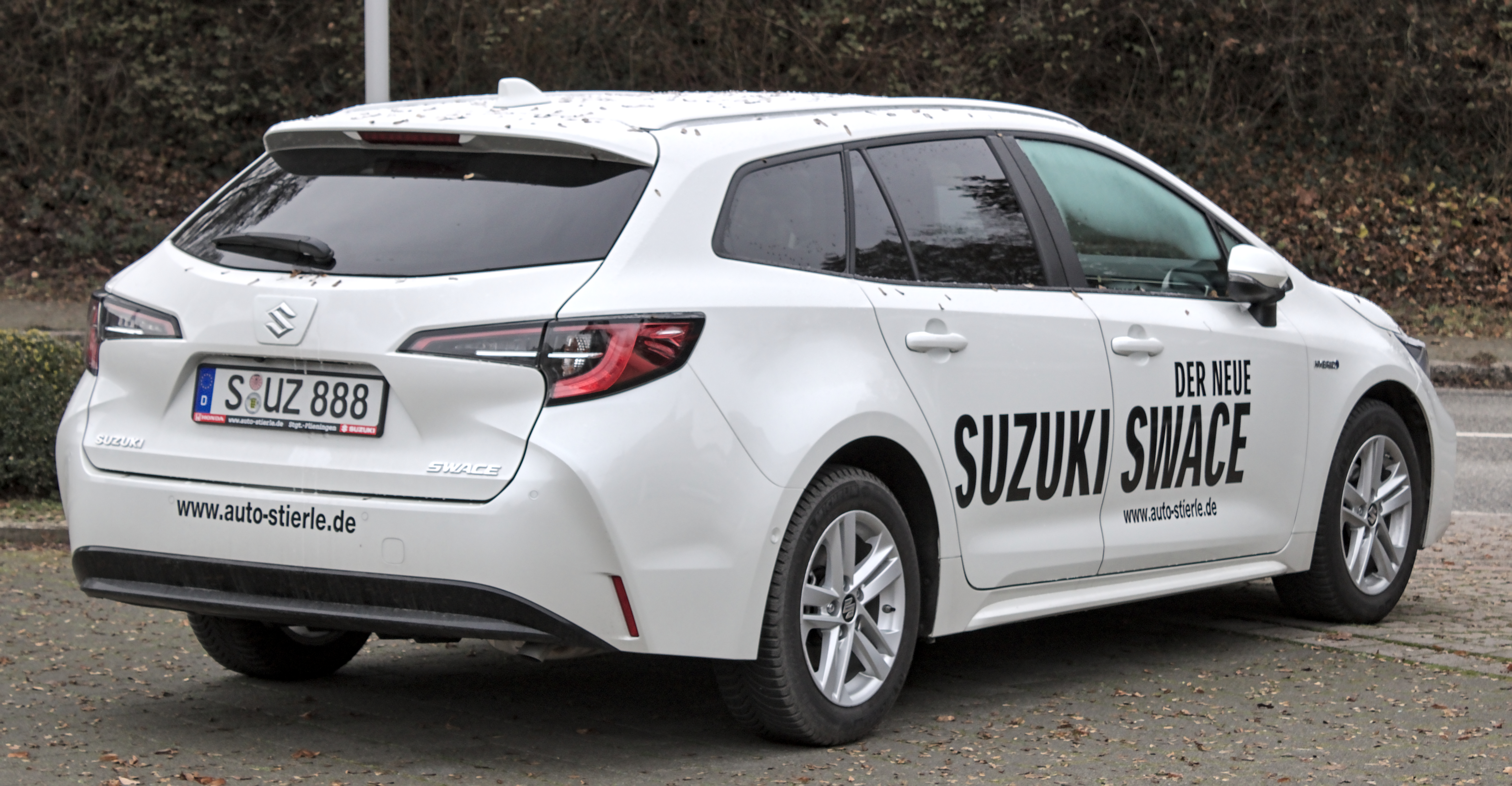
Suzuki Swace (Europe)

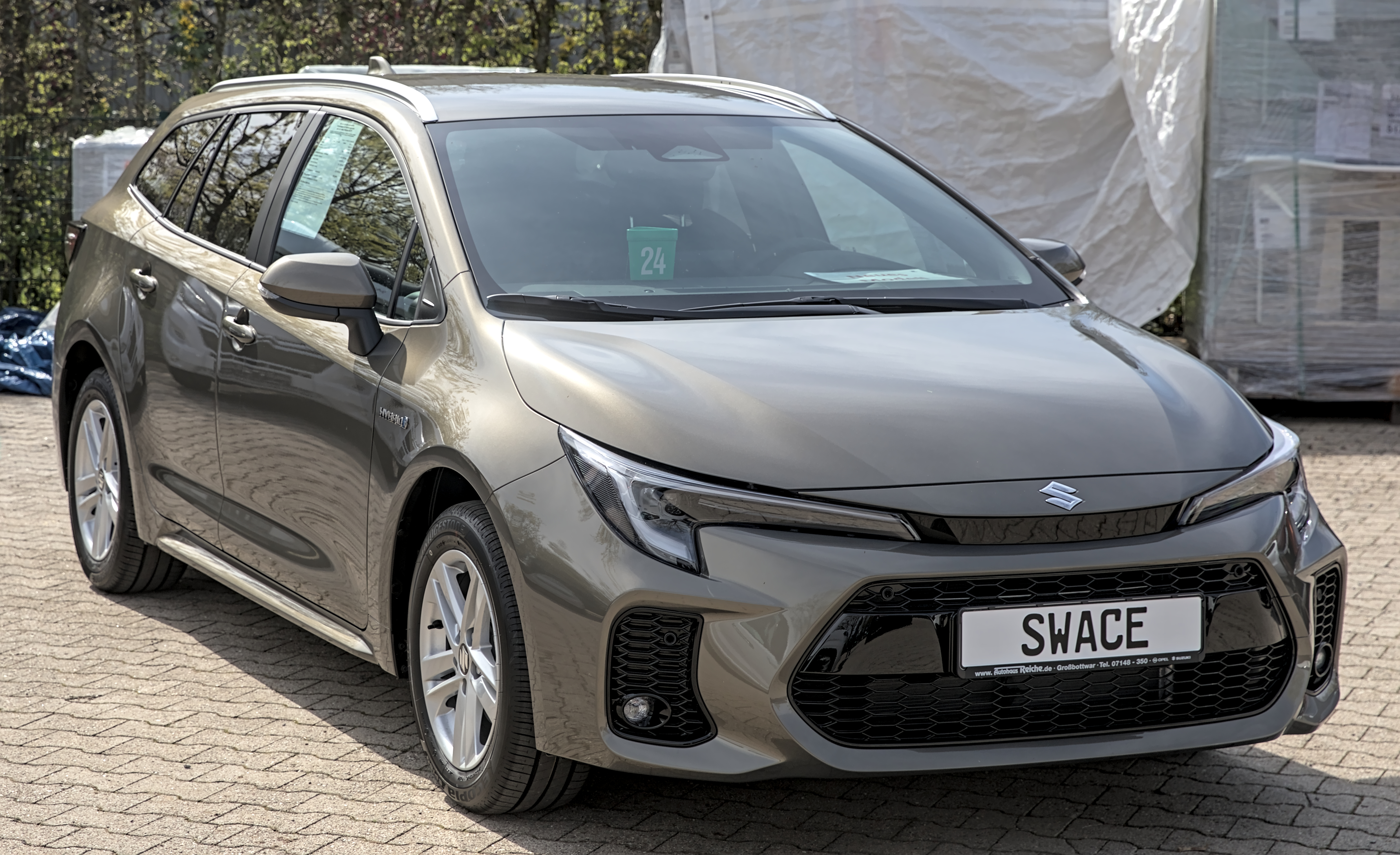
Facelift

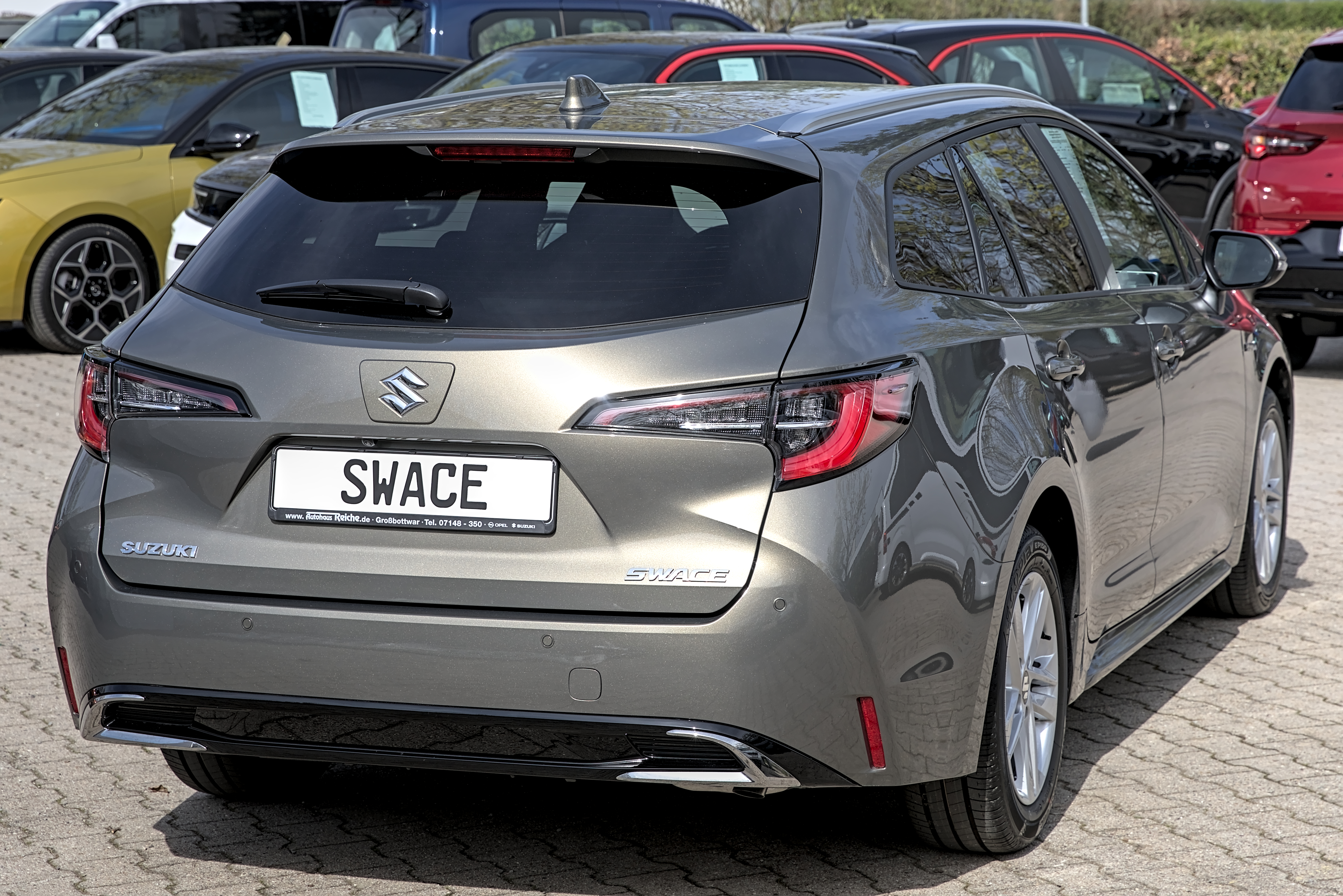
Rear view

==== United Kingdom ====
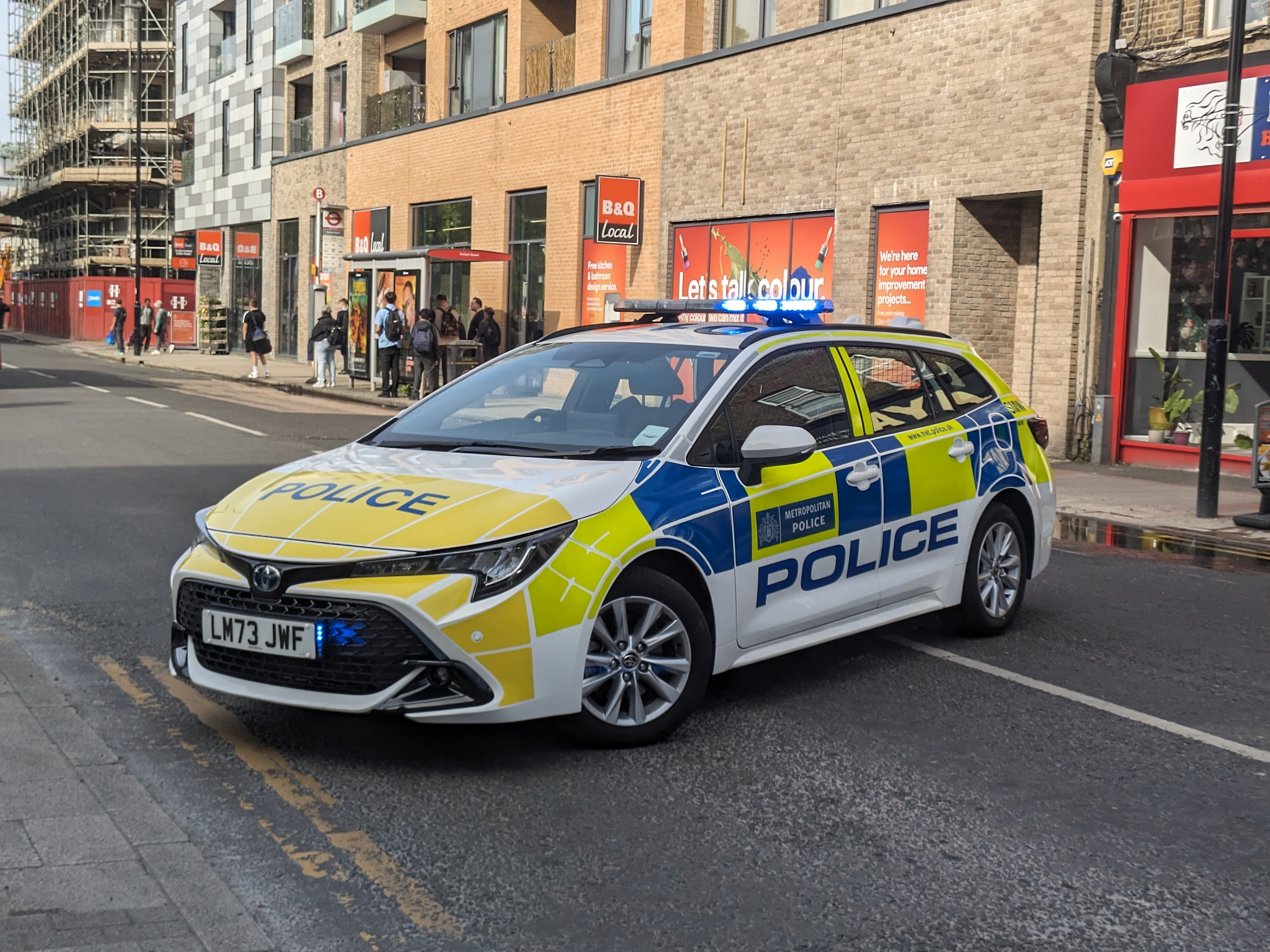
A Toyota Corolla used by Metropolitan Police

In the UK, the Corolla Hatchback and Touring Sports are marketed as Icon, Icon Tech, Design, Trek, GR Sport and Excel. Toyota Safety Sense 2.0 is available on all trim levels. The top-of-the-line Excel was initially only sold with 1.8-litre 2ZR-FXE or 2.0-litre M20A-FXS hybrid engines. When the 1.2-litre 8NR-FTS non-hybrid powertrain was discontinued in December 2019, all trims became full hybrid vehicles.

The Turkish-built Saloon was also available in Icon, Icon Tech and Design trim levels. The Saloon, and Trek trim level, were discontinued at the facelift. The UK-only Corolla Commercial car-derived van was introduced in August 2021, and updated in February 2023 with a fifth-generation hybrid powertrain and improved safety features.

In the UK, Corolla engines are constructed in Deeside, Wales with the main vehicle assembly line in Burnaston, Derbyshire, though only the Estate and Hatchback are produced in the UK. As of 2024, Corollas (both hatchback and estates) make up the majority of new front line response vehicles for the urban police services of the United Kingdom. Many police services in the UK started equipping Toyota Corolla Touring since 2022.

==== Ireland ====
In Ireland, where the saloon is more popular than in the UK, the Corolla saloon was offered with either 1.6-litre petrol, or 1.8-litre hybrid. Trim levels are Aura, Luna, Luna Sport, and Sol. The base model Aura and mid-level Luna came with 16-inch alloy wheels, the Luna Sport has 17-inch, and the top-of-the line Sol is equipped with 18-inch alloys.

=== North America ===
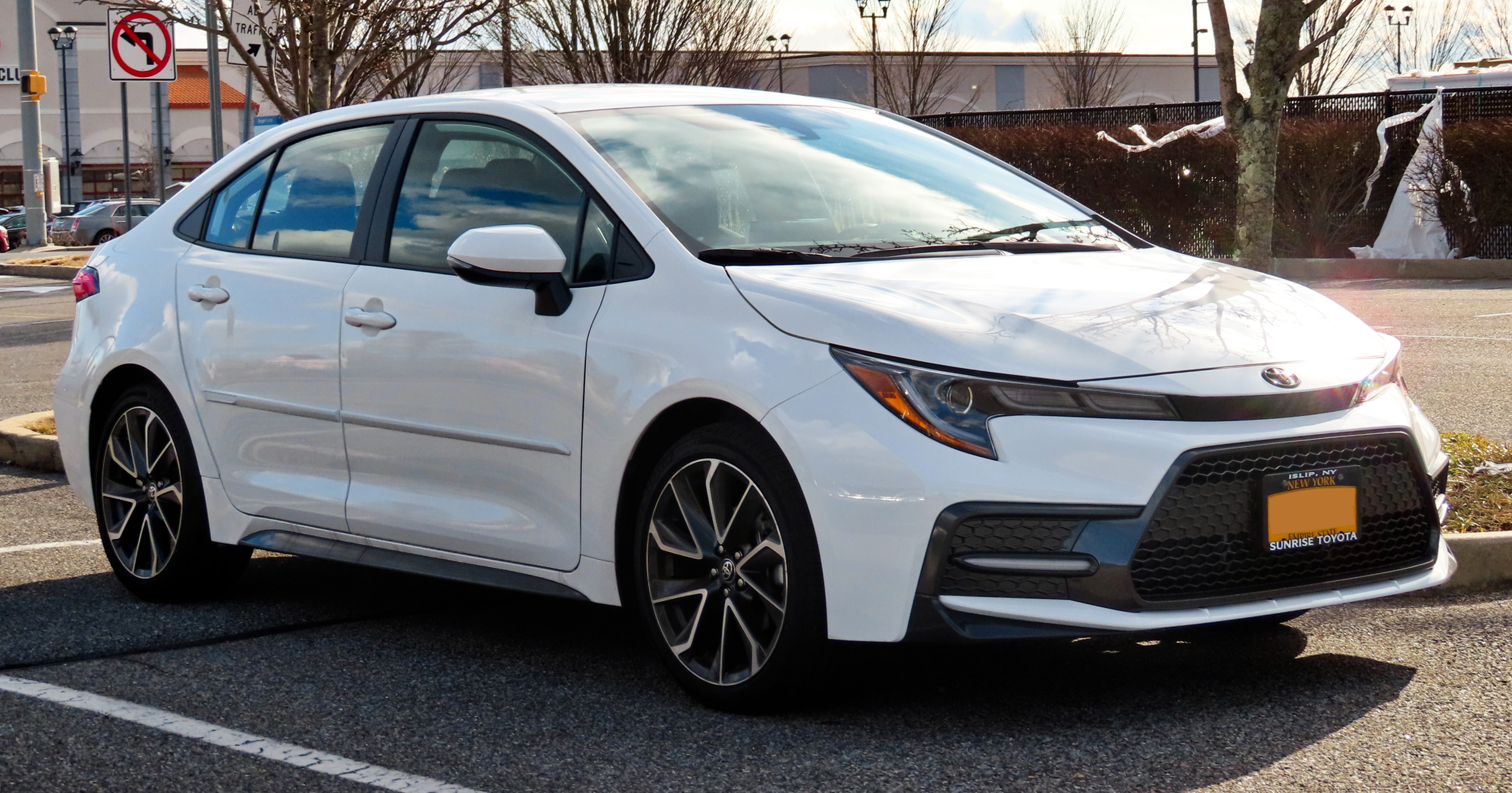

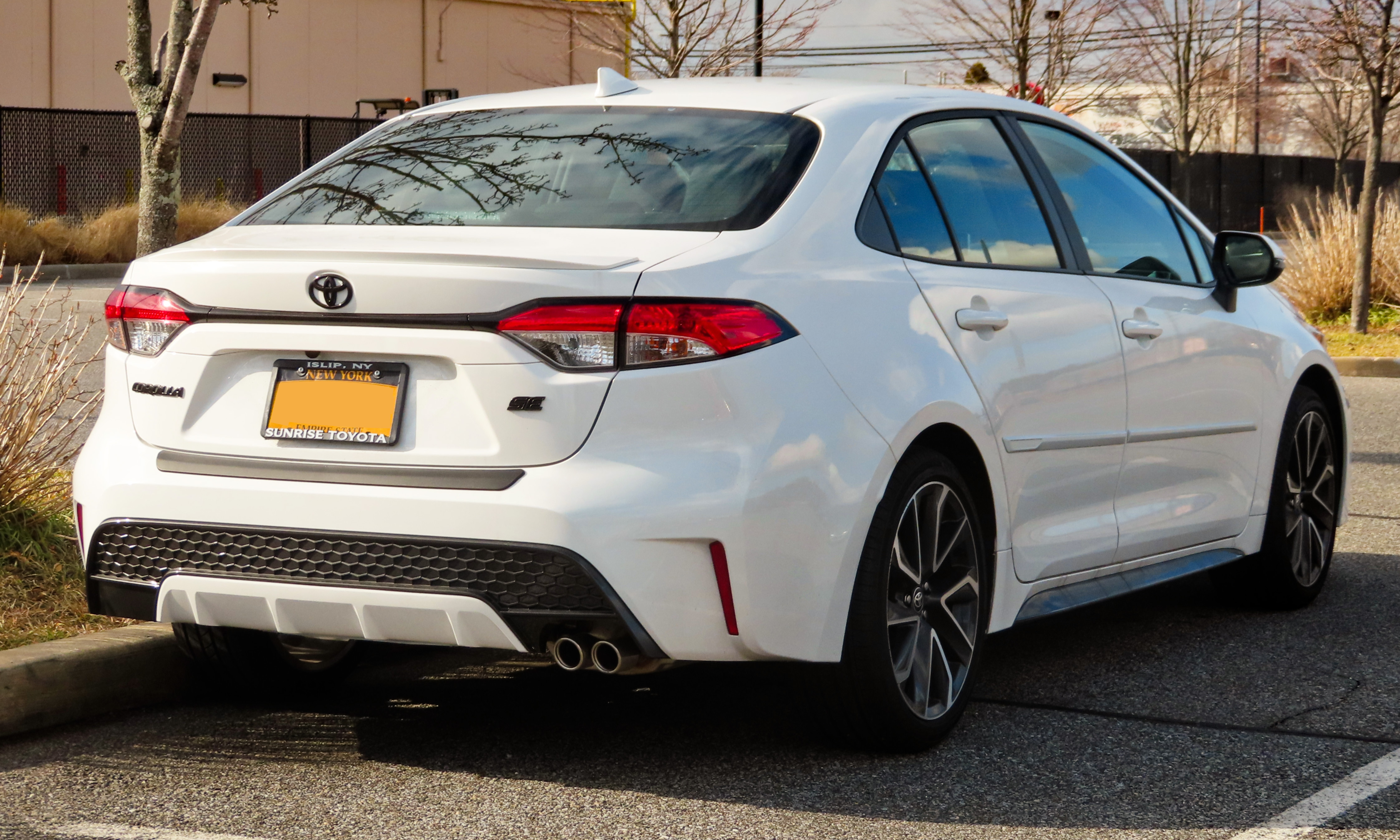
Corolla SE (MZEA12, North America)

The North American version of the hatchback was unveiled on 28 March 2018 at the New York International Auto Show for the 2019 model year. Unlike for the saloon, neither the hybrid powertrain nor all-wheel drive is available on the hatchback. The hatchback is only offered in the "sporty" SE and XSE trim levels and is powered by the 2.0-litre M20A-FKS Dynamic Force straight-four engine (I4) paired with either a six-speed intelligent manual transmission (iMT) or the K120 Direct Shift continuously variable transmission (CVT). The Direct Shift CVT includes a physical first gear (known as a "launch gear") and nine additional simulated gears, for a total of ten. The launch gear is engaged when the car takes off from being stopped and transitions to the belt drive once the car picks up speed. The benefit of this system is that traditional CVTs tend to have low efficiency in lower gear ratios (creating a moment of sluggishness when starting from a stop). Since belts are handling a more narrow band of gear ratios, belt angles and loads can be reduced, increasing shift speeds and offering a 6% improvement in fuel efficiency.

The twelfth generation is the first version of the Corolla in the United States to offer a hybrid engine. It was unveiled at the November 2018 LA Auto Show. The hybrid Corolla drivetrain is mechanically almost identical to the Prius with a fuel economy figure of 4.5 L/100 km (52 mpg_{‑US}; 62 mpg_{‑imp}) matching the base model Prius. Since the Corolla sells at higher volumes than the Prius, offering a hybrid helps the company meet corporate average fuel economy (CAFE) standards, and Toyota's market research showed that Hispanic customers preferred the Corolla to the Prius.

The saloon went on sale in the United States on 26 February 2019 for the 2020 model year. L, LE and XLE grades are equipped with the 1.8 litre 2ZR-FAE inline-four engine paired with the older K313 CVT, all carried over from the prior generation E170 Corolla in North America. The Hybrid LE model uses the 2ZR-FXE inline-four engine (an Atkinson cycle variant of the 2ZR-FAE) paired with the Hybrid Synergy Drive eCVT. The "sporty" SE and XSE grades use the same powertrain as the hatchback, the 2.0-litre M20A-FKS "Dynamic Force" engine paired with either six-speed iMT (SE only) or the “Direct Shift” CVT.

The twelfth generation Corolla saloon came to the Mexican market on 7 May 2019 in Base (replacing L), LE, SE and Hybrid versions. In the Mexican and Canadian markets, the Base/L model is available with a six-speed manual transmission.

In September 2020, Toyota released the limited edition Corolla Apex in the United States for the 2021 model year. Based on the SE or XSE saloon models, the Apex comes with stiffer and lowered springs, adjusted dampers, a bigger anti-roll bar, and 18-inch black alloy wheels. Front, side, and rear bumper spoilers are also standard. Toyota says it would only build 6,000 Corolla Apex units, of which only 120 would be equipped with six-speed manual transmission, all of them on the SE trim level.

On 1 June 2022, Toyota introduced a mid-cycle refresh of the North American Corolla. The refresh included minor exterior design revisions and major mechanical revisions; all 2023 model year non-hybrid Corollas offer the XSE's 169 hp (126 kW) four-cylinder engine and K120 CVT as standard; the 6-speed manual is discontinued. The Corolla Hybrid LE and Hybrid SE offer an eFour all-wheel-drive system as an option with its 1.8 L 2ZR-FXE I4 Hybrid Synergy Drive engine, with the rear wheels powered by an electric motor, increasing net horsepower to 138 hp (103 kW).

Engine choices for the North American Corolla are:

- 1.8 L, 2ZR-FAE straight four-cylinder, 139 hp (104 kW), 126 lb⋅ft (171 N⋅m) (Base/L, LE and XLE models, 6-speed manual (except US) or K313 CVT, 2019–2023)
- 1.8 L, 2ZR-FXE straight four-cylinder with Hybrid Synergy Drive system, 121 hp (90 kW), 105 lb⋅ft (142 N⋅m) (Hybrid LE model, eCVT)
- 2.0 L, M20A-FKS straight four-cylinder, 169 hp (126 kW) at 6,600 rpm, 151 lb⋅ft (205 N⋅m) at 4,400 rpm (SE and XSE models, LE and XLE since 2023 model year; 6-speed manual (2019–2023 in US) or K120 CVT with physical first gear)
- 1.8 L, 2ZR-FXE straight four-cylinder with Hybrid Synergy Drive system, 138 hp (103 kW), 105 lb⋅ft (142 N⋅m) (Hybrid LE/SE AWD, eCVT)

=== Oceania ===
==== Australia ====
The Corolla hatchback was launched in Australia on 7 August 2018, while the Corolla saloon went on sale on 26 November 2019. Both are available in three trim levels: Ascent Sport, SX and ZR. All variants are powered by a 2.0-litre engine. The 6-speed manual transmission is only available as standard on the base model Ascent Sport, while automatic CVT is optional for the Ascent Sport and standard on the mid-level SX and top-of-the-line ZR. The 1.8-litre engine with hybrid drivetrain is also available for all trim levels except the ZR trim of the Corolla saloon.

Sales of purely petrol-powered Corolla hatchbacks were discontinued in March 2024, shifting the hatchback lineup to hybrids only, with the exception of the GR Corolla. The Corolla saloon continued to be offered in purely petrol-powered variants until January 2025, and the range became only offered with hybrid powertrains.

As of November 2025, all Corolla models are automatic only, excluding the high performance GR Corolla. The hatchback is offered with three trim levels: Ascent Sport, SX and ZR. The saloon is offered in Ascent Sport and SX trims.

==== New Zealand ====
The Corolla Hatchback is available in GX, SX and ZR trims with options for hybrid or purely petrol models for each. The hybrid and purely petrol models all share the same engine for each of their respective power plants. All are equipped with CVT transmission.

The sales of purely petrol-powered Corollas in New Zealand were discontinued in July 2022, shifting the lineup to hybrid-powered models only, with the exception of the GR Corolla performance hatch.

=== Saudi Arabia ===
For the Kingdom of Saudi Arabia, the twelfth generation of the Corolla was launched in July 2019. It is the first Corolla generation in the Kingdom to include a hybrid version, which has a fuel efficiency of 27.6 km/l (78.0 mpg_{‑imp}; 64.9 mpg_{‑US}).

=== South Africa ===
The E210 Corolla Hatchback has been available in South Africa since February 2019 in two trim levels: XS and XR. Both are powered by a 1.2-litre 8NR-FTS engine. Both the six-speed iMT and CVT are available on the XS trim, while the XR is only offered with CVT.

Sales of the saloon began in March 2020. Both XR trims get a six-speed manual or CVT, while the XS remains available as either a CVT or Hybrid as of September 2021. The range was updated in November 2022, dropping the 1.2-litre engine in favour of the 1.8 hybrid powertrain in both the saloon and hatchback models, while the 2.0 engine was retained in both body styles.

Unlike the previous generations, the E210 Corolla saloon is no longer manufactured in South Africa. The older E180 continued to be produced in the country and sold as the Corolla Quest. After 11 years, production of the Quest ended in March 2025.

=== Southeast Asia ===
==== Brunei ====
In Brunei, the Corolla Altis saloon was launched in January 2020. It is fully imported from Thailand. The models include 1.6- and 1.8-litre petrol engines with 7-speed CVT transmissions.

==== Indonesia ====
The Corolla Altis for the Indonesian market was launched on 12 September 2019 and is fully imported from Thailand. Initial trim levels were 1.8 G, 1.8 V and 1.8 Hybrid paired with CVT. All-around disc brakes are standard on all models. The hybrid trim is equipped with Toyota Safety Sense.

On 8 February 2022, the G trim was dropped from the lineup, leaving only the V and Hybrid trim levels. The Hybrid trim gained a wireless charger and updated Toyota Safety Sense, which consisting all-speed Dynamic Radar Cruise Control and adds Lane Tracing Assist.

==== Malaysia ====
In Malaysia, the Corolla is offered in 1.8 E and 1.8 G trim levels paired with CVT, with Toyota Safety Sense only available for the latter. Although marketed as "Corolla" only, it retained the "Altis" badge like the rest of other Southeast Asian countries as it is a CBU model imported from Thailand.

==== Philippines ====
In the Philippines, initial trim levels of the Corolla Altis were 1.6 E (with manual transmission only), 1.6 G (with either manual transmission or CVT), 1.6 V (with CVT only) and 1.8 V Hybrid (with eCVT only).

In November 2021, the Corolla Altis gained an 8-inch infotainment system with Apple CarPlay and Android Auto as standard for the V and Hybrid trims, while the manual transmission option was dropped for the G trim.

In April 2022, the 1.6 V GR Sport variant was launched, while the 1.8 GR Sport Hybrid grade was launched during the 8th Philippine International Motorshow on 15 September 2022.

==== Singapore ====
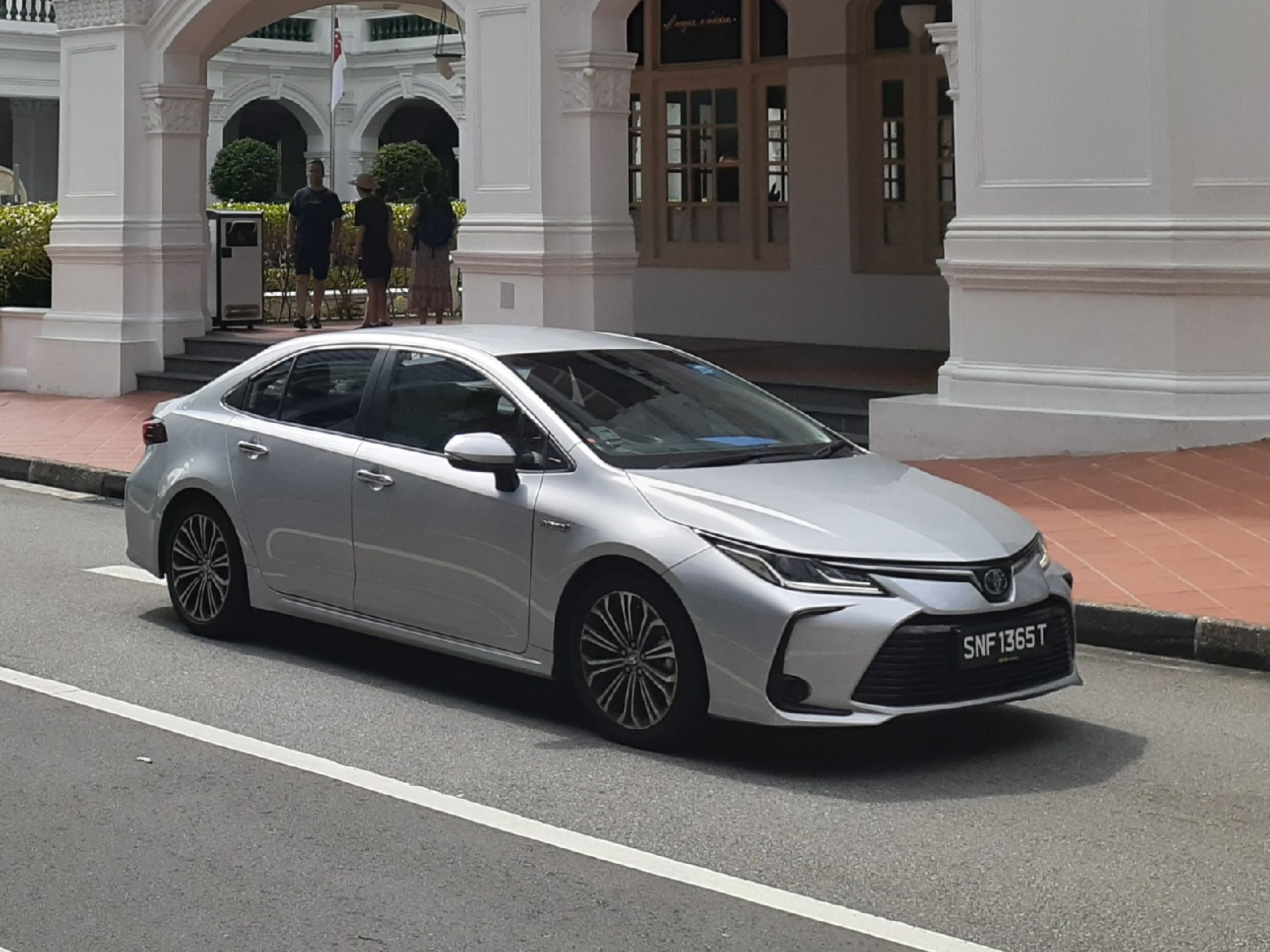
Pre-facelift Corolla Altis Hybrid (ZWE211, Singapore)

The Corolla Altis made its debut during the Singapore Motorshow on 9 January 2020; with the local dealership offering in Standard and Elegance trim levels with 1.6-litre Dual VVT-i petrol engine, and a Hybrid model with 1.8-litre engine.

Through parallel import dealerships, the Japanese and Australian models of the Corolla saloon and Corolla Touring are available in Ascent Sport, X, G-X, S and G variants in 1.8 hybrid variants only.

==== Thailand ====
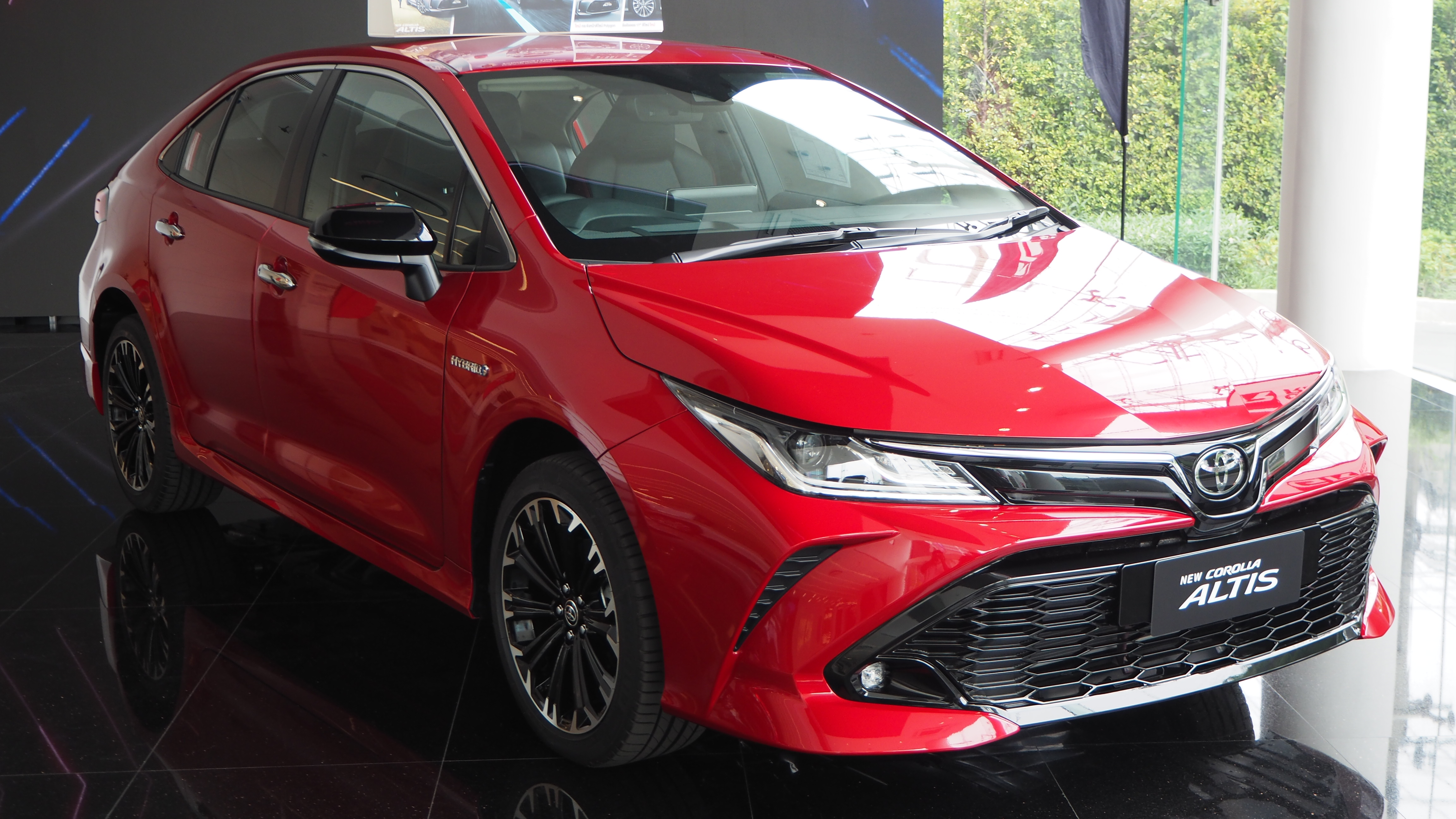
Pre-facelift Corolla Altis Hybrid GR Sport (ZWE211, Thailand)

Thailand was the first country in Southeast Asia to launch the E210 series Corolla Altis. Based on the 1.6 J, the cheapest model of the Thai market Corolla Altis is called Limo, which is intended as a taxi. The other trim levels are 1.6 G, 1.8 GR Sport, Hybrid Entry, Hybrid Mid and Hybrid High. All engines are paired with CVT. Toyota Safety Sense was exclusive to Hybrid High trim.

In January 2021, the Hybrid trim levels Entry, Mid and High were changed to Hybrid Smart, Hybrid Premium and Hybrid Premium Safety respectively and the 1.8 Sport trim was also introduced.

In January 2022, the Limo and Hybrid Smart trims were discontinued and Hybrid Premium Safety trim was replaced by the Hybrid GR Sport grade.

==== Vietnam ====
In Vietnam, the E210 Corolla Altis was released on 9 March 2022 and is offered in 1.8 G, 1.8 V and 1.8 HV grade levels. Unlike the previous generation, it is imported from Thailand instead of being locally assembled.

The facelifted Corolla Altis for the Vietnamese market was launched on 4 October 2023. Similar to the pre-facelift model, it is available in three grades: G, V and Hybrid. The G and V grades are powered with the 1.8-litre 2ZR-FE petrol engine, while the Hybrid grade is powered with the 1.8-litre 2ZR-FXE hybrid petrol engine; Toyota Safety Sense is standard on V and Hybrid grades.

=== Taiwan ===
The Auris for the Taiwan market was launched on 12 September 2018 and is fully imported from Japan. The Auris was renamed the Corolla Sport in July 2020.

The Corolla Altis for the Taiwan market was launched on 27 March 2019. Trim levels are offered in 1.8 and 1.8 hybrid paired with CVT. The Corolla Altis hybrid was also available for the first time in Taiwan. Both the Taiwan market Corolla Altis and Corolla Altis hybrid are locally assembled.

On 29 April 2020, the Corolla Altis GR Sport made its debut in Taiwan, which was developed by Kuozui Motors.

The facelifted Corolla Altis was launched on 25 April 2023. Trim levels remained the same as the pre-facelift model, with the Monarch petrol, Flagship petrol and Flagship Hybrid trims being discontinued and replaced with Deluxe Plus petrol and Luxury Hybrid trims. Similar to the pre-facelift model, it is offered in two engines: the 1.8-litre 2ZR-FE petrol engine and the 1.8-litre 2ZR-FXE hybrid petrol engine.

In May 2024, the Corolla Altis GR Sport received a facelift with a 2.0-litre M20A-FXS Dynamic Force engine. It also received more aggressive style front bumper, black trunk spoiler, smoked rear lights, and dark gunmetal 18-inch alloy wheels. Inside, the facelifted GR Sport has black combination of leather and faux suede seats with red stitching, red seatbelts, and black carpets with red edging.

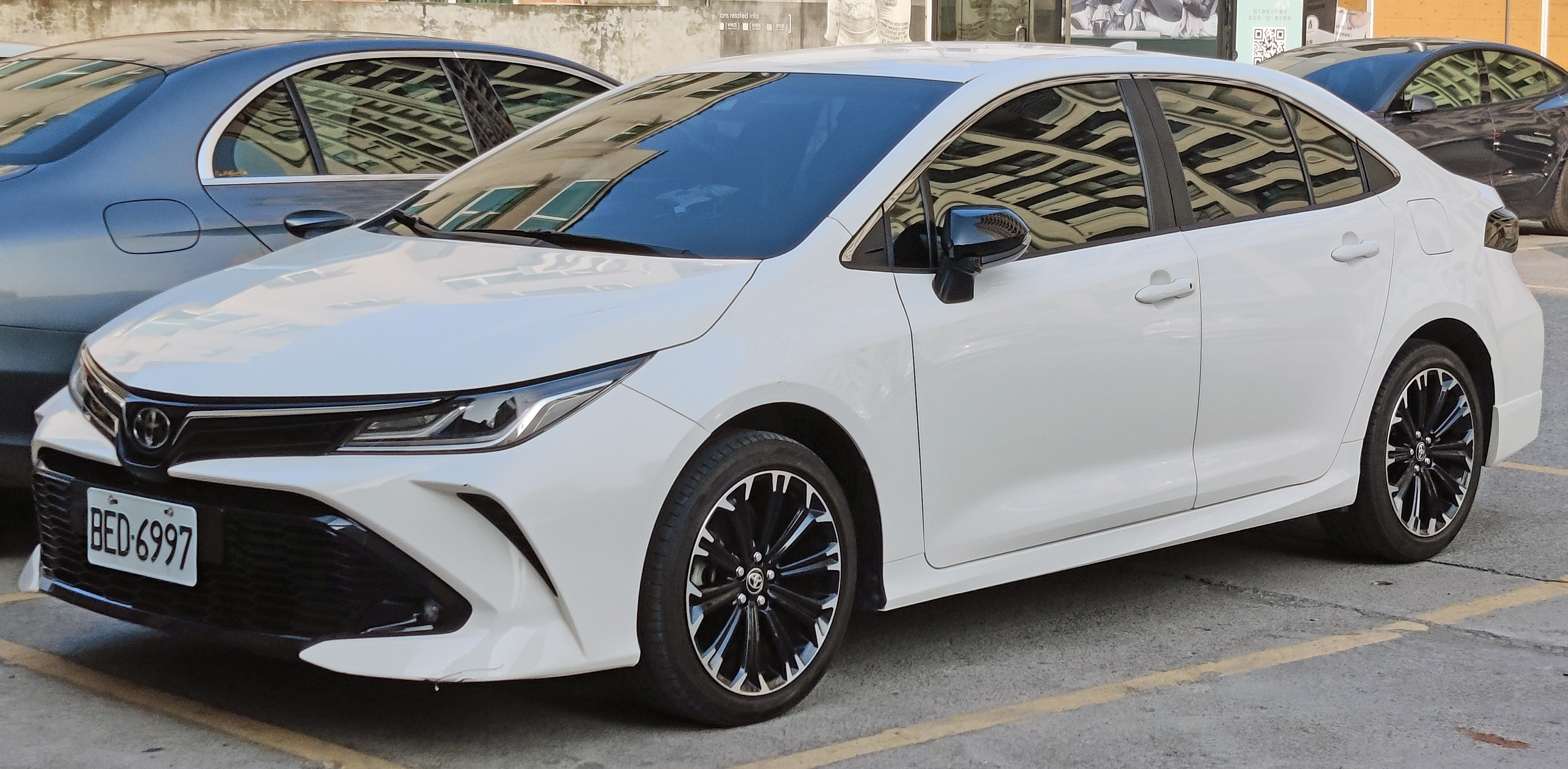
Corolla Altis GR Sport (Taiwan)

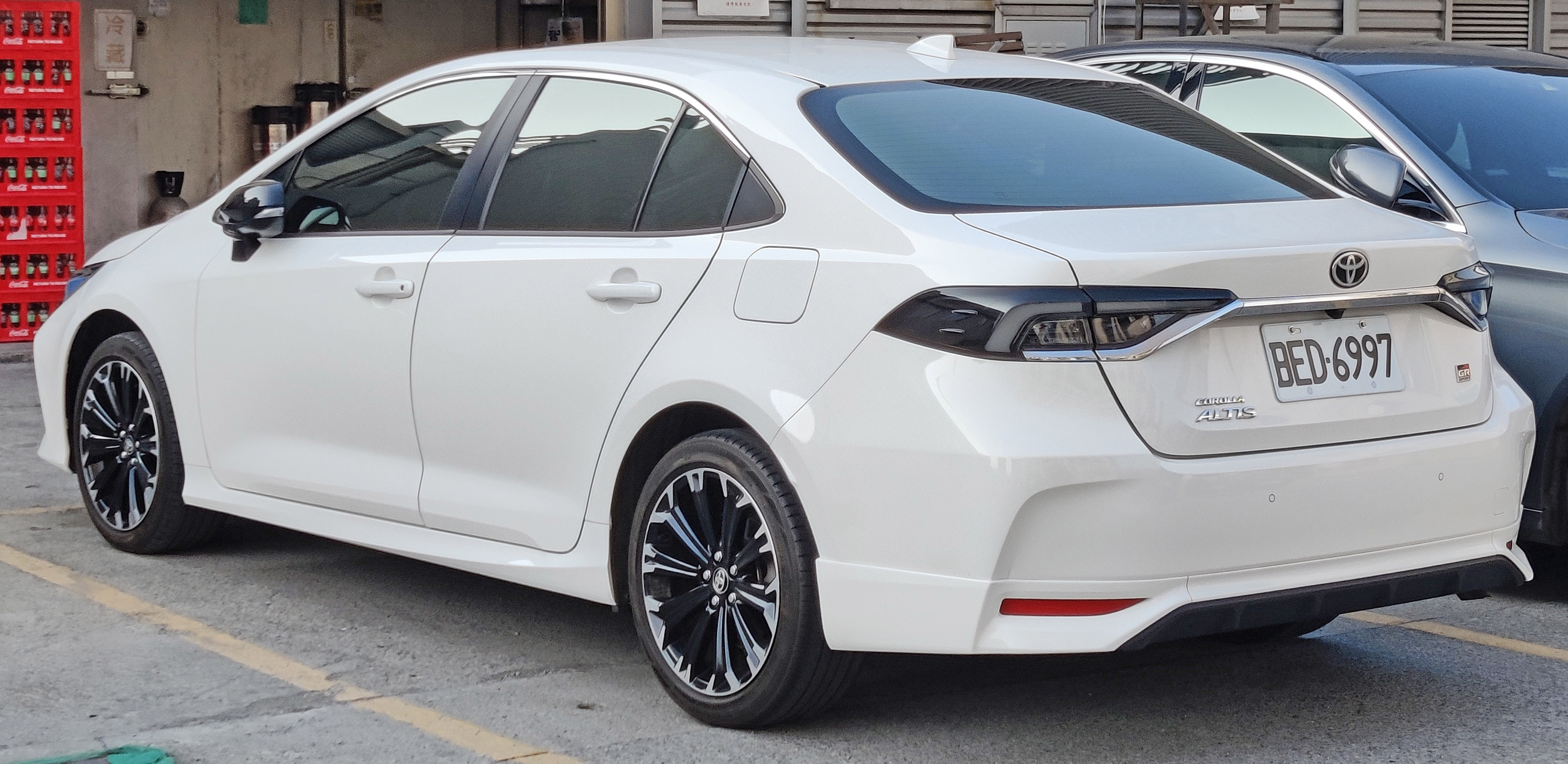
Corolla Altis GR Sport (Taiwan)

== Facelift ==
=== Africa ===
==== South Africa ====
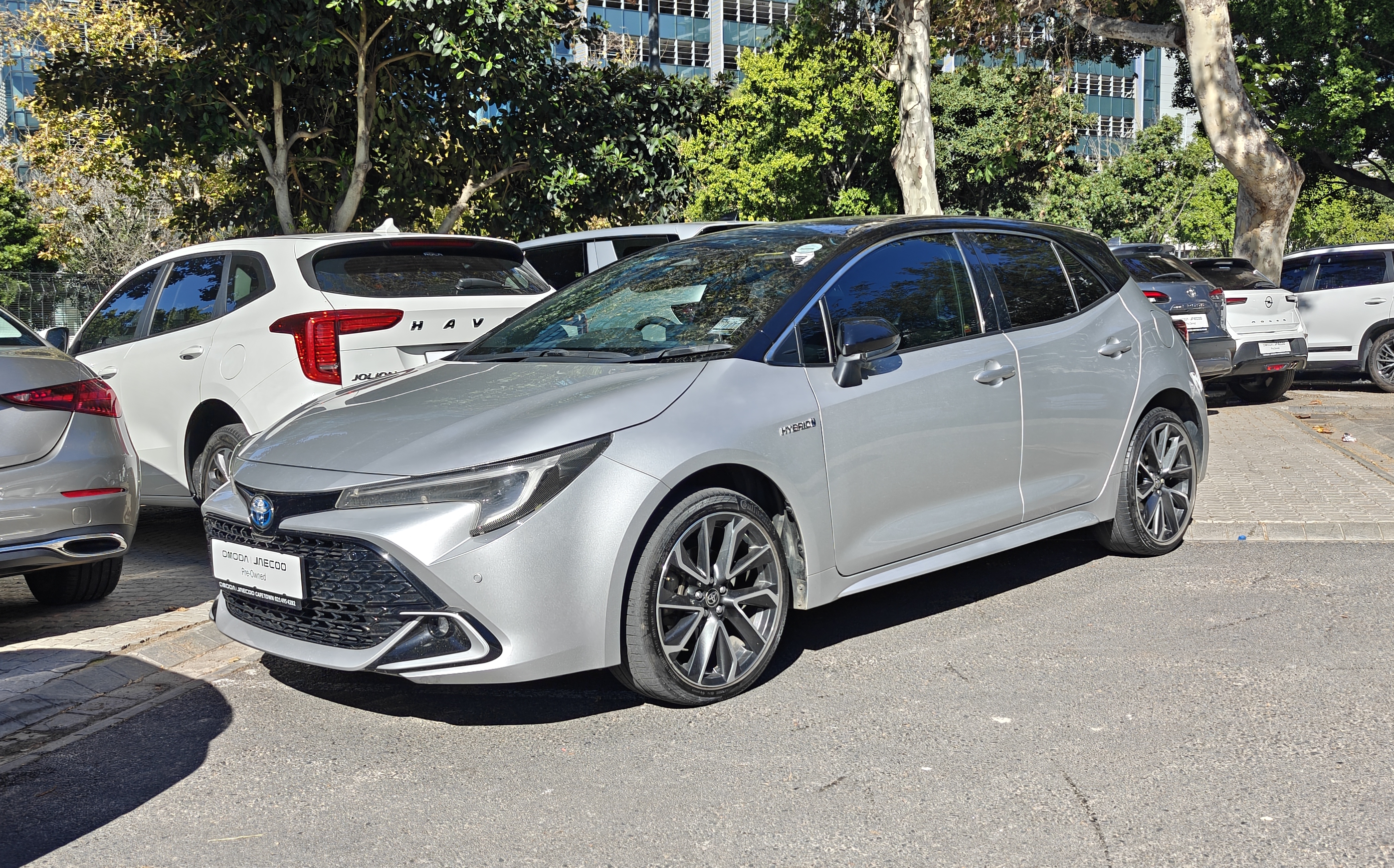

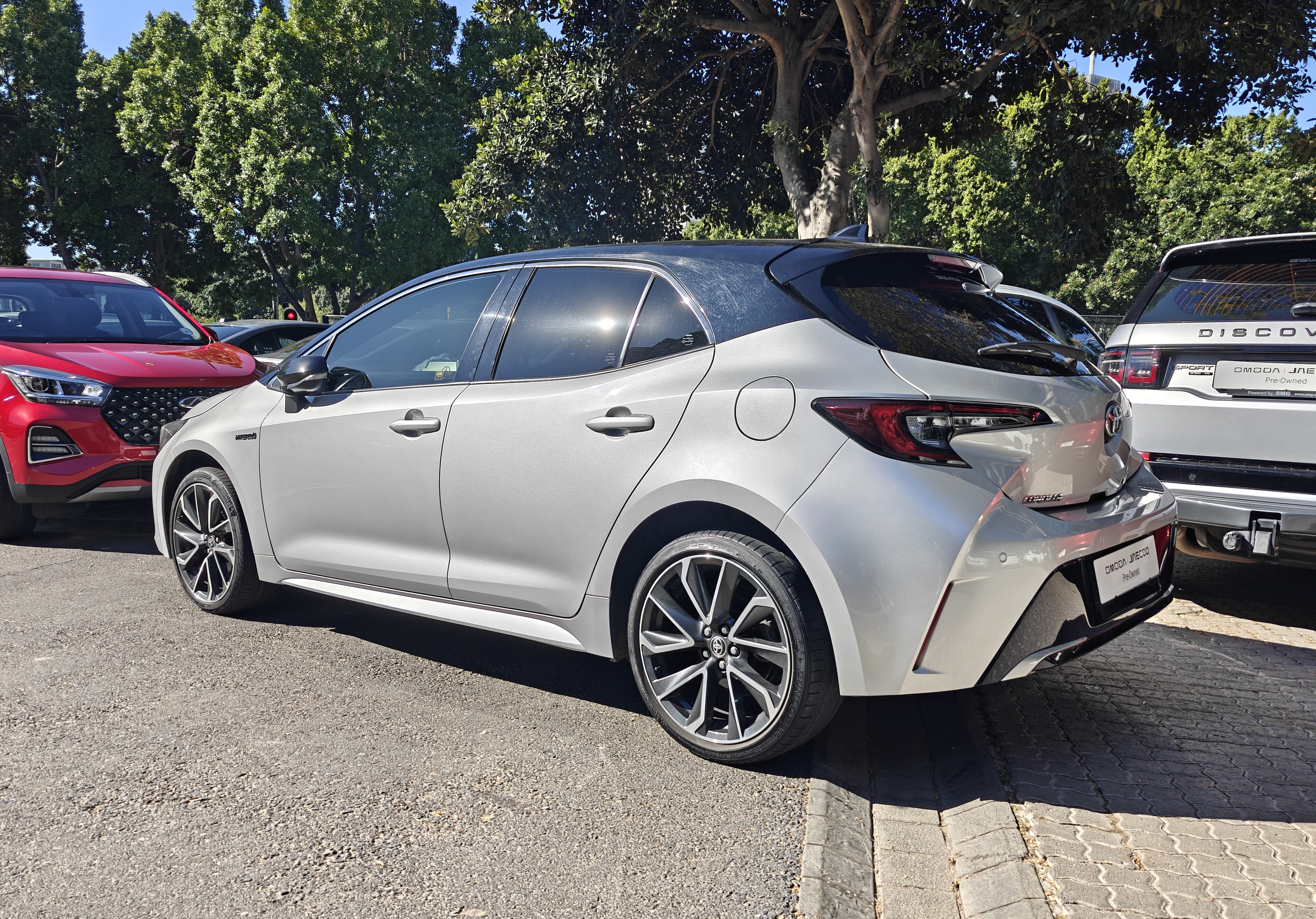
2024 Corolla hatchback 1.8 Hybrid XR (South Africa)

The facelifted E210 Corolla was announced in South Africa in November 2022, and introduced for the 2023 model year. The refreshed lineup was the first to include a hybrid hatchback variant of the Corolla in the South African market. The refresh included updated styling, new infotainment systems, the inclusion of a fully-digital gauge cluster for the XR hatch, and the addition of standard heated seats and wireless charging for the sedan. Power and torque also increased slightly for the two-litre engine.

The 2023 lineup comprised a 1.8 XS and XR hybrid saloon and hatch variant, and a 2.0 XR petrol saloon and hatch variant. XR hatch models were also offered with bi-tone paint. The Corolla ranged from approximately R500,000 to R540,000 - above the average new passenger-vehicle price at the time. It received positive reviews from local motoring journalists, especially for its refinement, reliability, warranty, and included features.

In January 2023, information was released about the new GR Corolla that would be offered locally. The car officially began being sold that July. It was offered in Core and Circuit variants, both powered by a turbocharged 1.6-litre three-cylinder engine. Pricing was roughly R840,000 and R900,000 respectively.

=== Asia ===
==== China ====
In November 2025, during the 2025 Guangzhou Auto Show, the 2026 model-year Corolla was unveiled featuring a restyled front end and an extended wheelbase matching the wheelbase of the FAW-Toyota Allion. The hybrid version is powered by a 1.8 litre naturally-aspirated engine paired with the hybrid system with the maximum output of 72 kW coming from the engine and an NMC battery. The petrol variant is powered by a 2.0 litre naturally-aspirated engine with a maximum output of 126 kW.

In December 2025, the updated long-wheelbase Levin was unveiled and was renamed the Levin L replacing the Levin GT. The update also features restyled interior, 8155P chips, and an additional 2.0-litre engine powertrain.

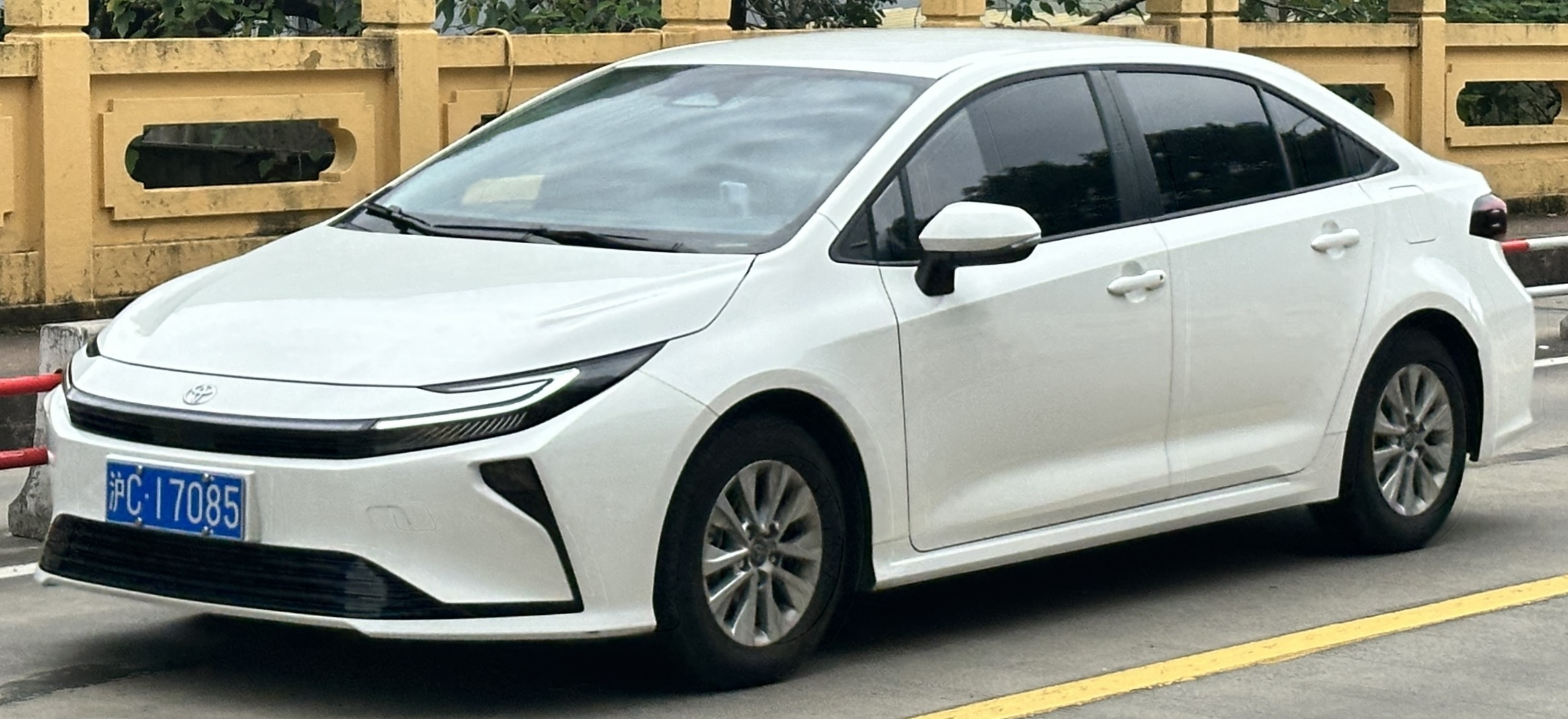
2025 facelift Corolla Hybrid (China)

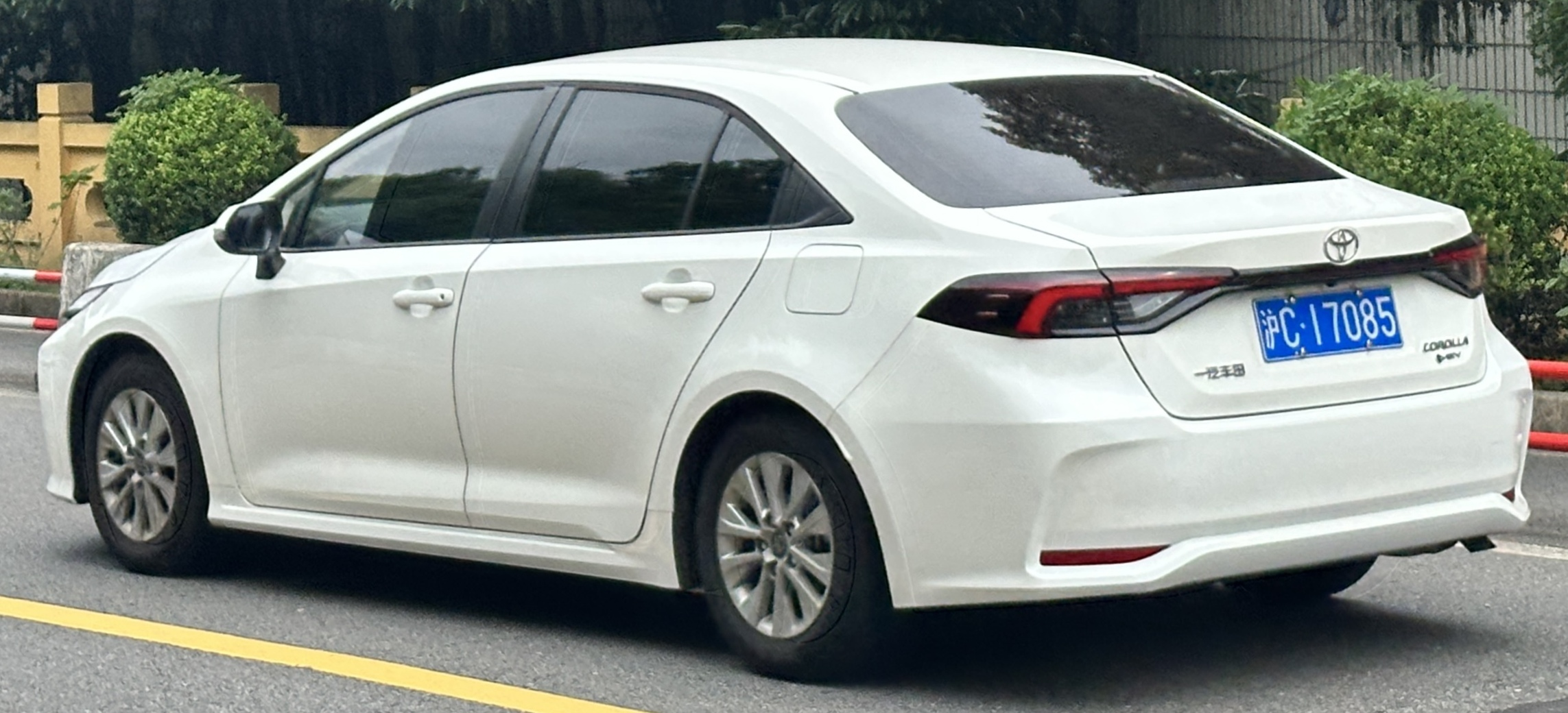
2025 facelift Corolla Hybrid (China)

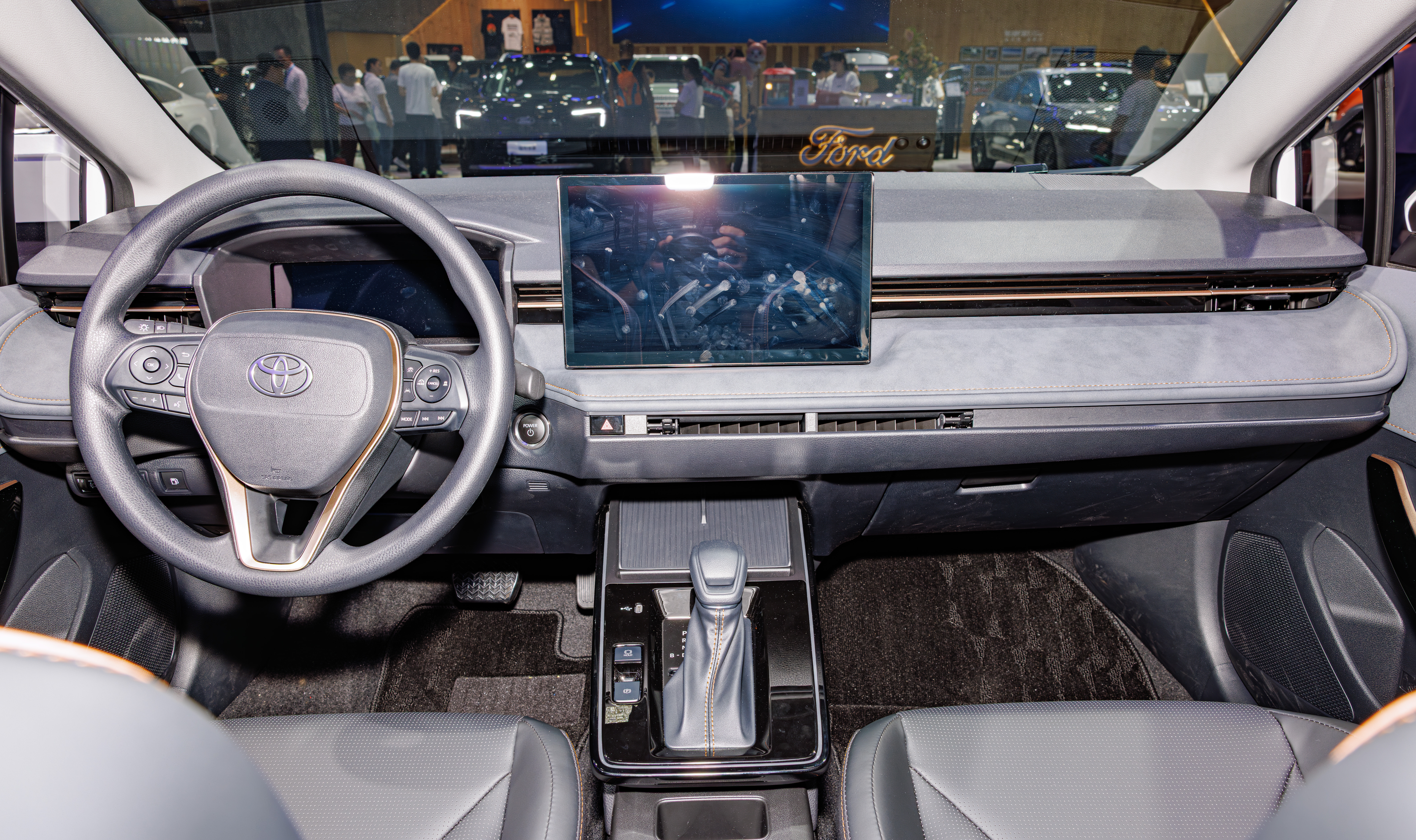
Interior (2025 facelift; China)

==== Japan ====
For the Japanese market, the facelifted Corolla was launched on 3 October 2022, retaining the saloon, Sport (hatchback) and Touring (estate) configurations. The "G-X" and "S" trims were dropped on the saloon and estate and replaced with ubiquitous "X" and "G" trims respectively from previous generations. Both the 8NR-FTS and 2ZR-FAE engine options were replaced by newer M15A-FKS engine for the saloon and Touring models, and the M20A-FKS engine for Sport model. The 2ZR-FXE hybrid drivetrain was retained on the facelifted model, with the 1VM electric motor (rated at 70 kW, 94 hp, 95 PS and 185 N⋅m, 136 lb⋅ft) replacing the previous 1NM motor.

In April 2024, Toyota released the Active Sport version of Corolla saloon and Touring (estate). These models featured aggressive style front bumper with black ornaments, black side skirts, black 17-inch alloy wheels, and optional "Active Sport" rear emblem. Powered by the same 1.8 litre Hybrid engine as the regular Corolla, the Active Sport is offered with either front wheel drive (FWD) or all-wheel-drive (E-Four). The FWD models also received tuned suspension for better handling. For the interior, the Active Sport came with black sport front seats with gray stitching, black leather upper dashboard and door trims, and aluminum pedals. Non-hybrid variants were discontinued in May 2025 across all body styles.

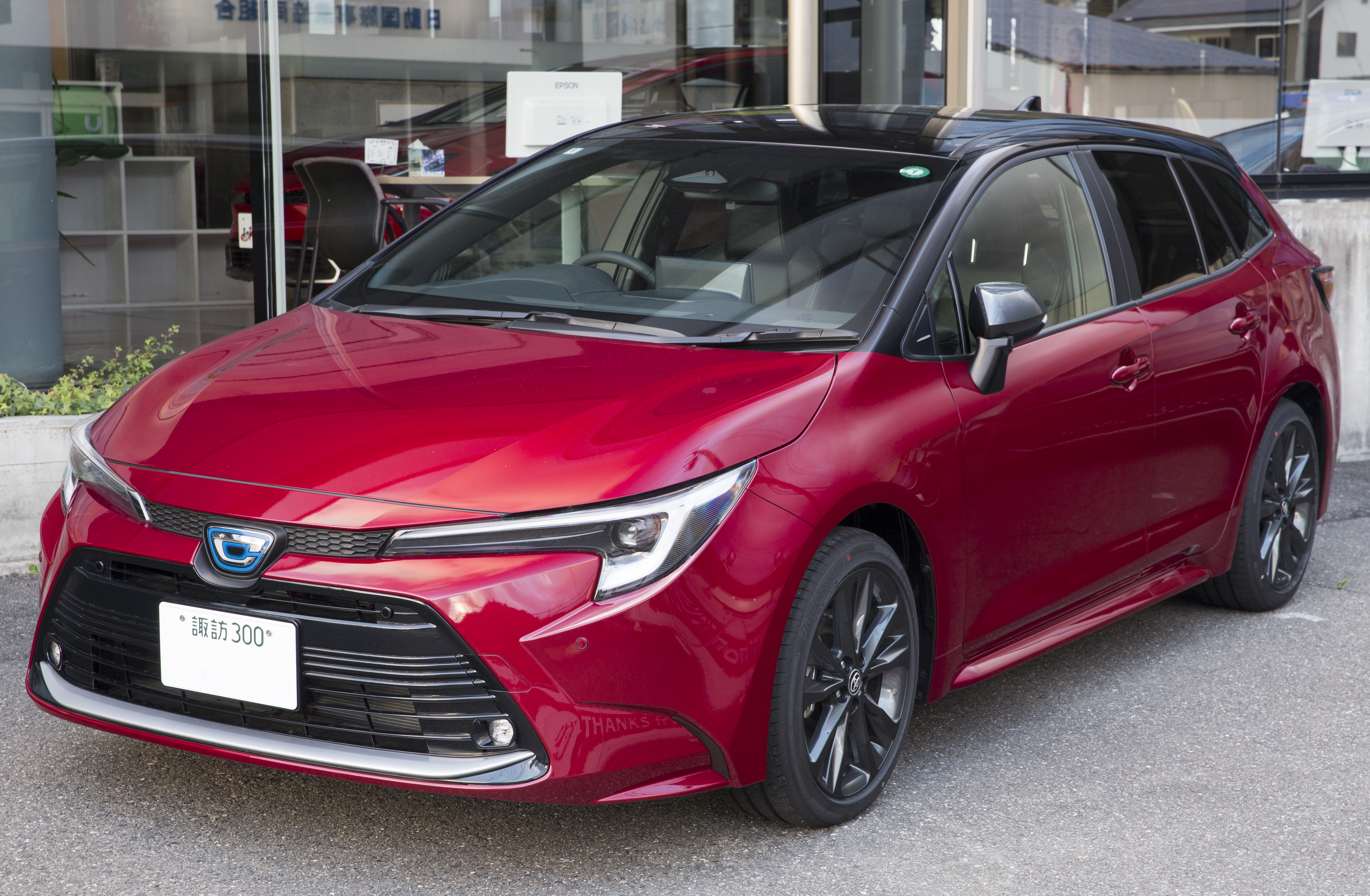
Corolla Touring Hybrid WxB (ZWE219W, facelift)

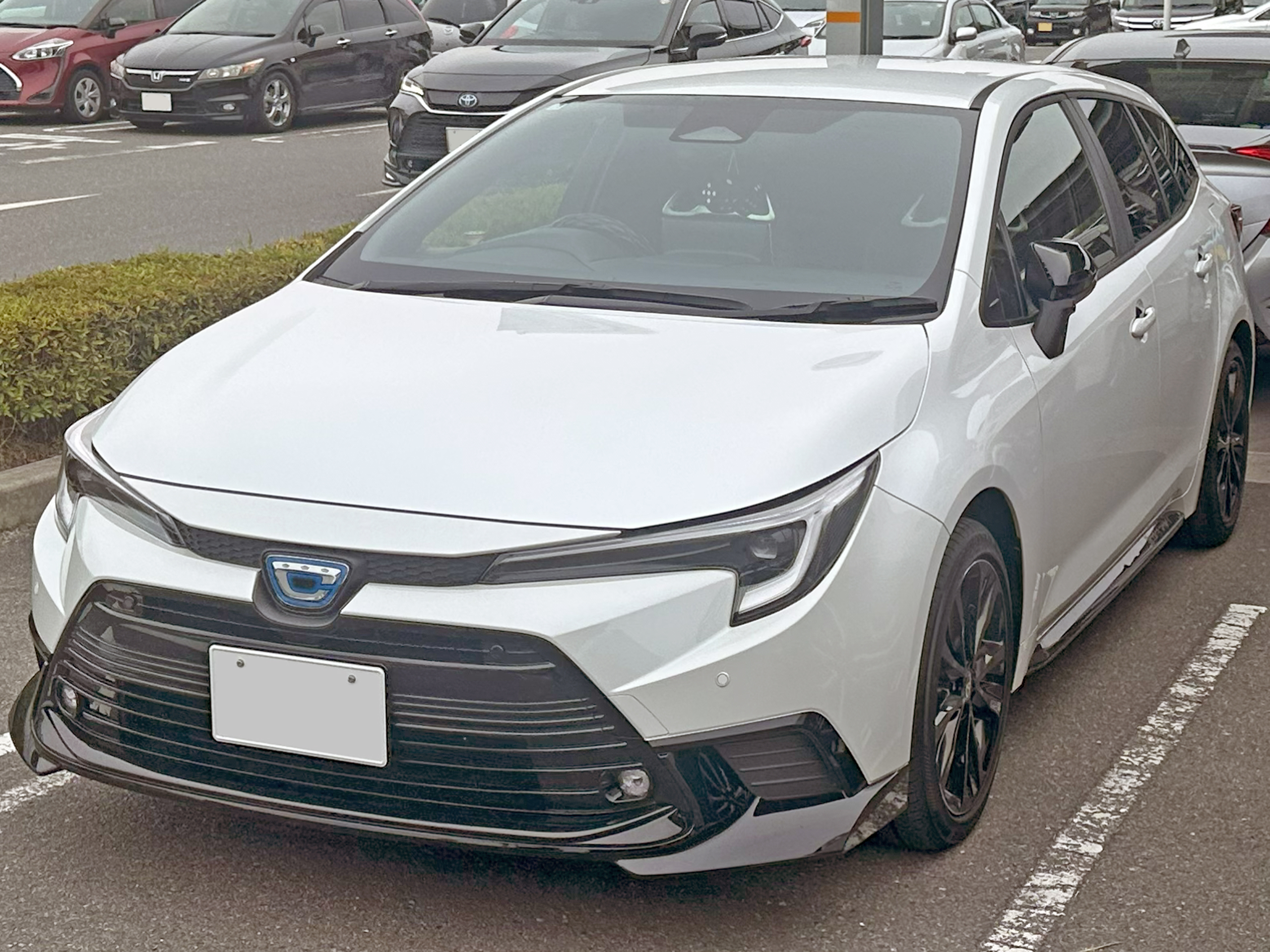
Corolla Touring Hybrid Active Sport (ZWE219W, facelift)

==== Southeast Asia ====
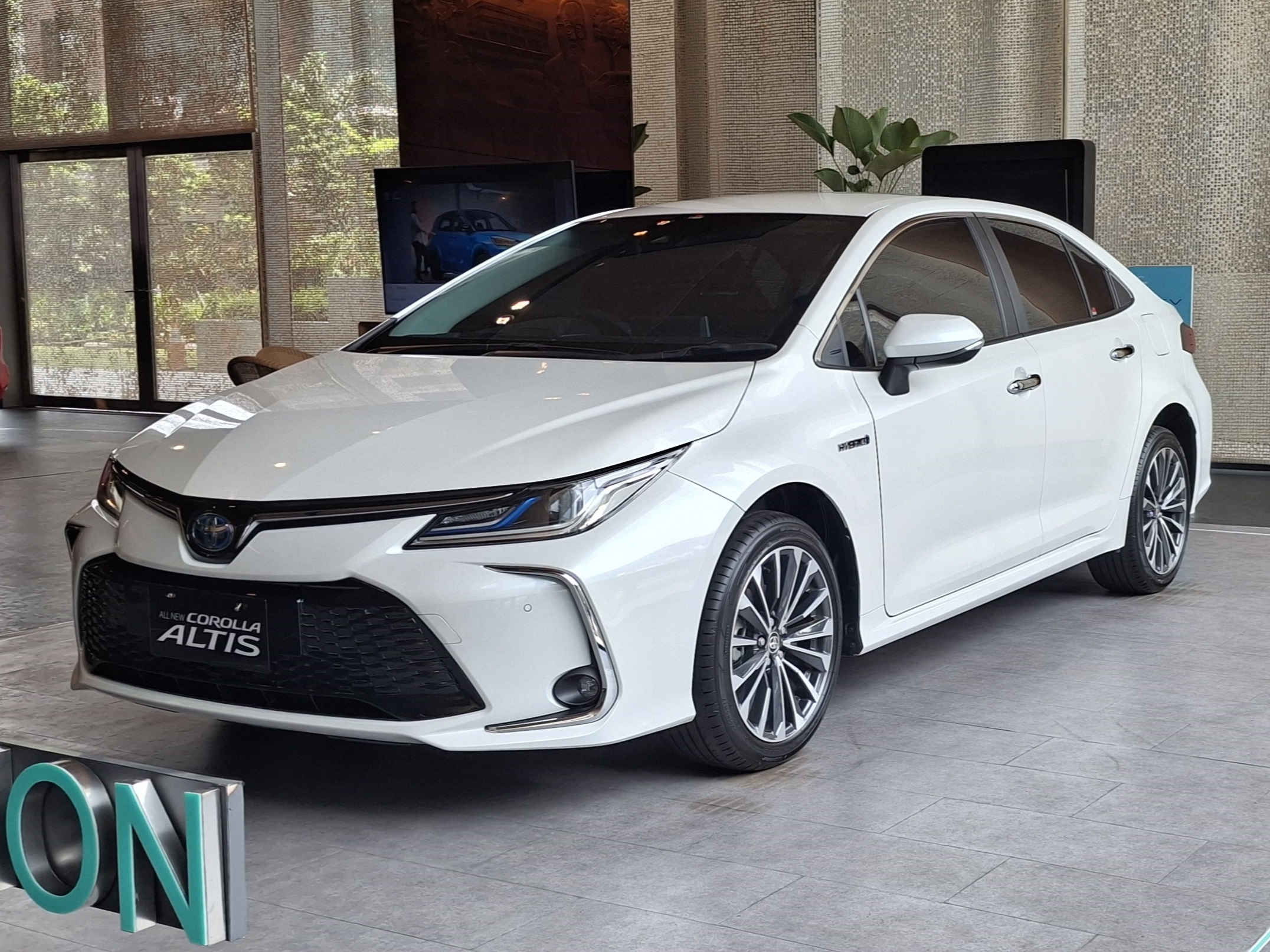
Facelift Corolla Altis 1.8 HEV (ZWE211)

The Corolla Altis received minor facelift noticeably with the honeycomb polygon pattern lower grille. The higher-grade models received the new style 17-inch alloy wheels and 12.3-inch fully digital instrument panel. Depending on the countries and model grades, the infotainment system was also upgraded.

The Corolla Altis GR Sport model received the same facelift as the Taiwanese version, but powered by the 1.8-litre engine with new ECU mapping and virtual 10-speed CVT. It also features revised suspension setting, smoked rear combination lamps, GR Sport leather seats with red stitchings, red seatbelts, and dark headliner.

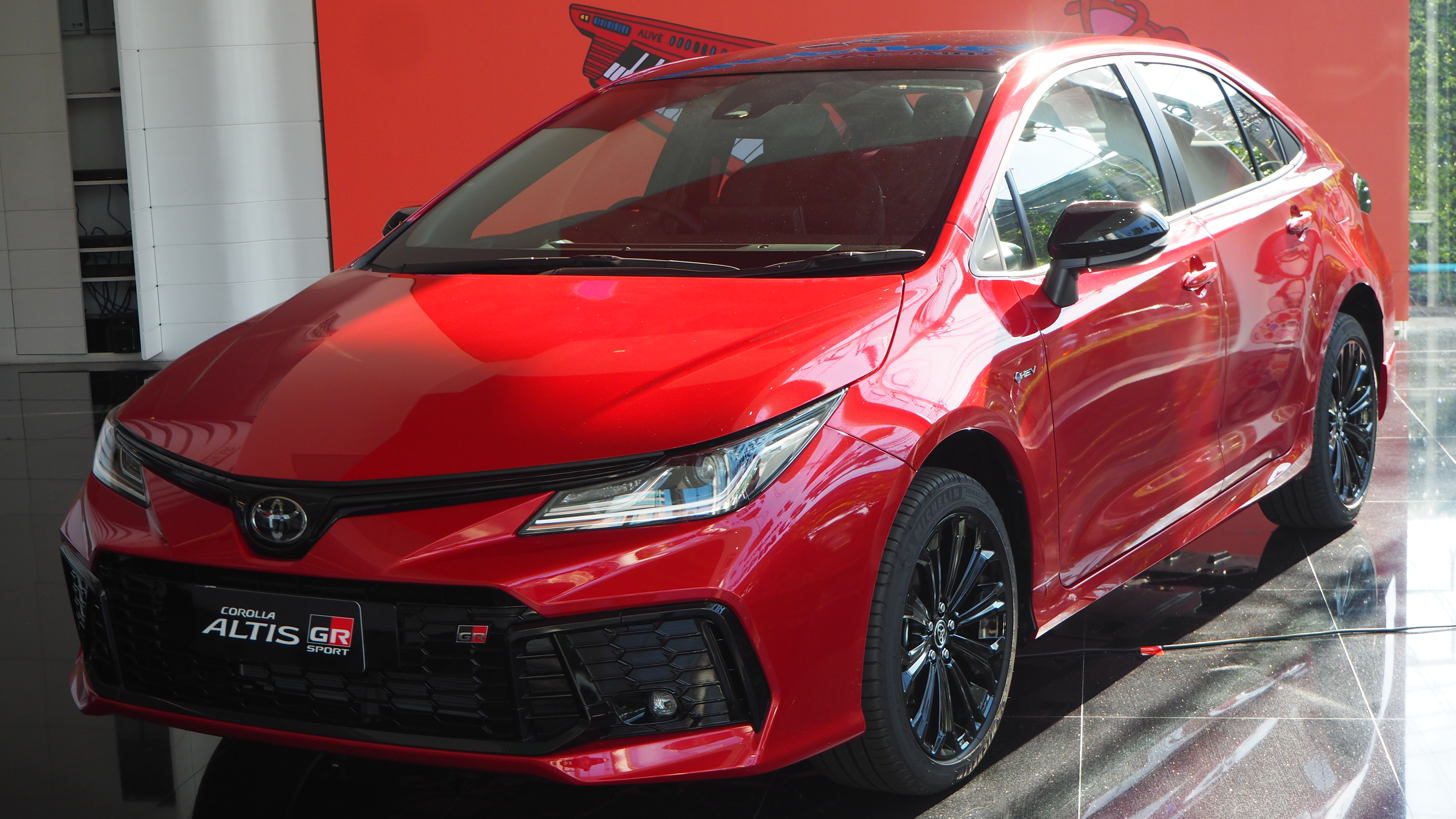
Facelift Corolla Altis HEV GR Sport (ZWE211, Thailand)

The facelifted Corolla Altis for the Thai market was launched on 8 June 2023. It is offered in four grades: 1.6 G, 1.8 Sport, Hybrid Premium and Hybrid GR Sport, the petrol GR Sport grade was discontinued from the lineup. Similar to the pre-facelift model, it is offered with three engines: the 1.6-litre 1ZR-FBE petrol engine on the G grade, the 1.8-litre 2ZR-FBE petrol engine on the Sport grade and the 1.8-litre 2ZR-FXE hybrid petrol engine on Hybrid Premium and GR Sport grades. Toyota Safety Sense is standard on Sport, Hybrid Premium and Hybrid GR Sport grades. The GR Sport received a facelift on 5 November 2024, featuring the new lithium-ion battery and upgrading most of the features. In March 2026, the Corolla Altis line-up was updated for the 2026 model year, which saw the discontinuation of the 1.6G and 1.8 Sport variants, and also the introduction of the 1.8G and HEV Smart variants.

In Indonesia, the facelifted Corolla Altis was launched on 29 September 2023. It is available in two grades: 1.8 V and 1.8 HEV. The HEV GR Sport grade was launched at the 32nd Gaikindo Indonesia International Auto Show on 24 July 2025.

Toyota Malaysia launched the facelifted Corolla on 28 August 2023. It is available in three grades: 1.8 E, 1.8 G and GR Sport, with the 1.8-litre 2ZR-FE petrol engine. Toyota Safety Sense is standard on G and GR Sport grades.

In the Philippines, the facelifted Corolla Altis was launched on 11 August 2023 alongside the Yaris Cross. It is available in three grades: E, G GR-S and GR-S HEV. The 1.6-litre 1ZR-FE engine was replaced with the larger 1.8-litre 2ZR-FE petrol engine that is only available on the former two grades, while the latter grade can only be paired with the 1.8-litre 2ZR-FXE hybrid petrol engine; the only transmission option available was CVT. Toyota Safety Sense is standard for the G GR-S petrol and GR-S HEV. In May 2026, the E HEV and G HEV variants were added to the lineup, with the petrol-powered G GR-S grade being discontinued.

Singapore's Borneo Motors officially offered the facelifted Corolla Altis on sale from January 2024. The 1.8 Hybrid was discontinued, leaving only the petrol-only 1.6 Standard and 1.6 Elegance in the line up.

=== Europe ===
For the facelift in the European market, Toyota offers an update exterior styling for the Corolla, but discontinued all non-hybrid powertrains. The updated Corolla is powered by either a 1.8-litre 2ZR-FXE hybrid petrol engine with a combined output of 103 kW (140 PS; 138 hp), or a 2.0-litre M20A-FXS Dynamic Force hybrid petrol engine with a combined output of 144 kW (196 PS; 193 hp). European market Corollas are equipped with an updated Toyota Audio Multimedia system, but utilising a 10.5-inch touchscreen, larger than the previous 8-inch screen.

In most Western European countries, the Corolla hatchback and Touring Sports estate are offered in four trim levels. These are base, mid-level, luxury, and GR Sport, although the grade names for other than GR Sport vary from one country to another. The base model has 16-inch alloy wheels, the mid-grade occupies 17-inch, the luxury and GR Sport have 18-inch. Head-Up Display and Alcantara seats are for the luxury version. Model grades for the UK market are Icon, Design, Excel, and GR Sport. All models are available with either the 1.8 or 2.0-litre engine.

For the German market, the facelifted Corolla initially came in base model Comfort, Business Edition, mid-level Teamplayer, GR Sport, and top-of-the-line Lounge. The Comfort was only offered with the smaller engine, while the other grades can be ordered with either the 1.8 or 2.0-litre engine. Later, the base model Comfort was renamed Active.

The Corolla four-door saloon was discontinued in the UK and Germany, but is still available in other countries. In Finland, the Corolla saloon was offered in Active, Style, Executive, and GR Sport grades alongside the hatchback and Touring Sports. The only engine for the saloon is the 1.8-litre hybrid.

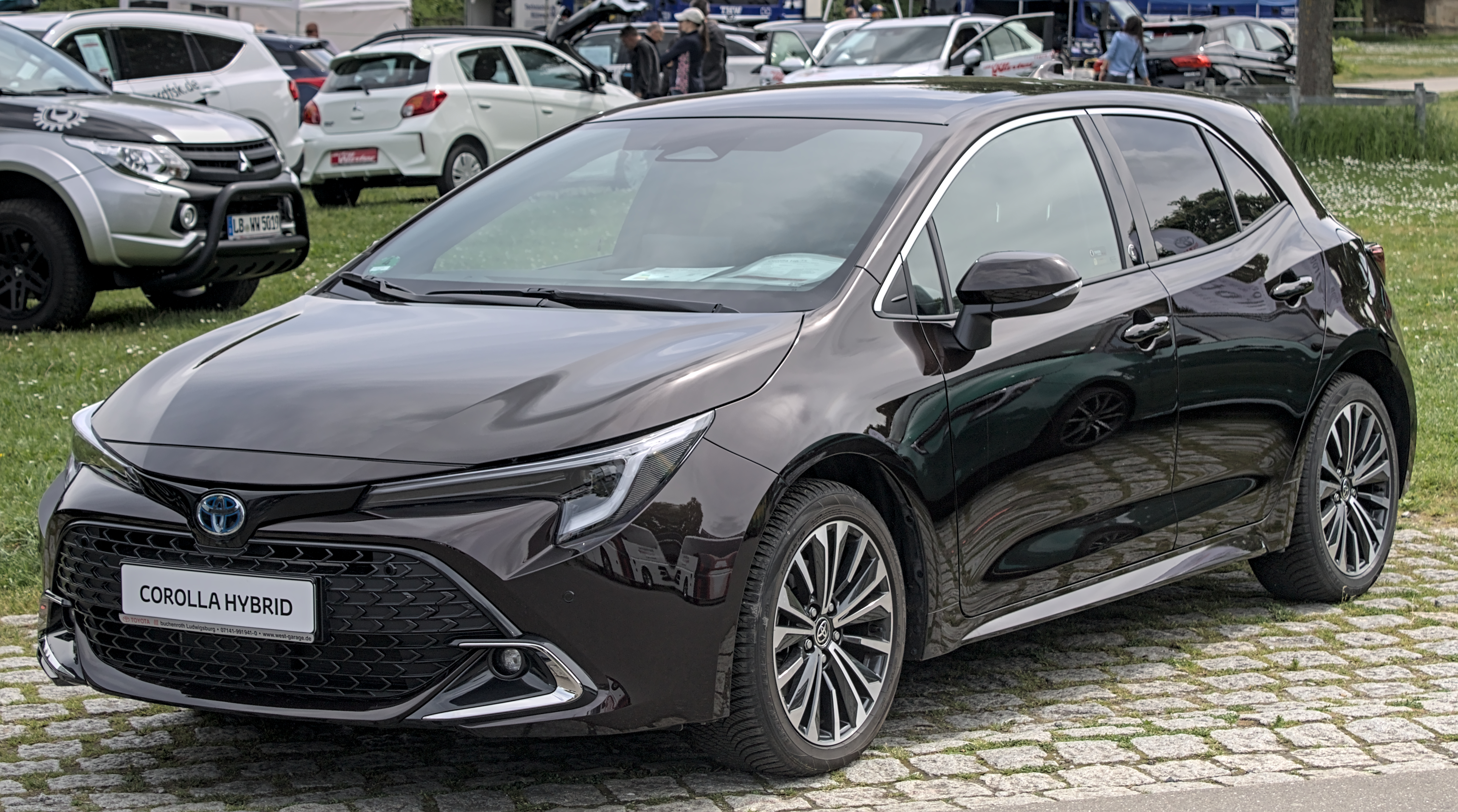
Hatchback (facelift)

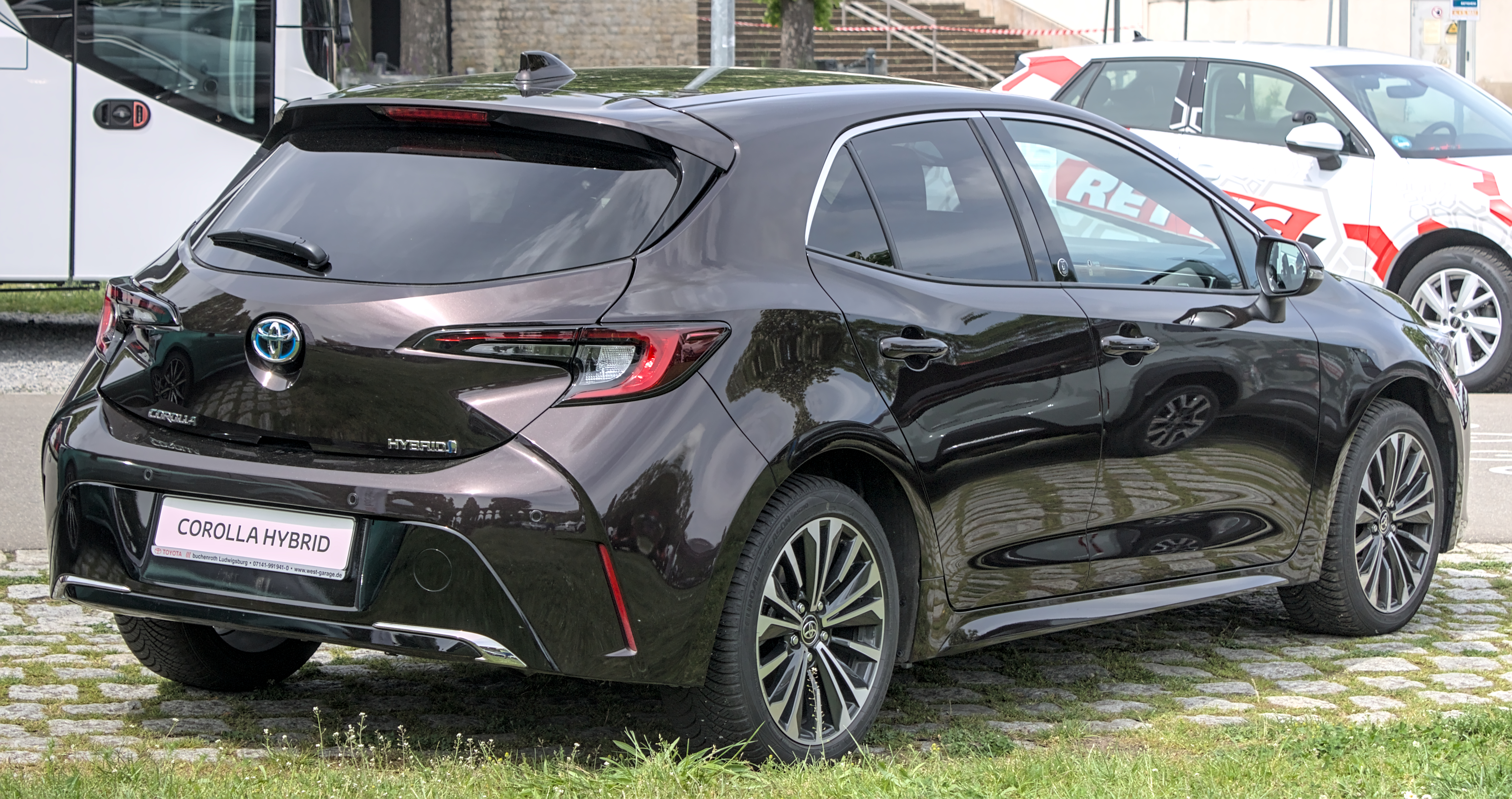
Hatchback (facelift)

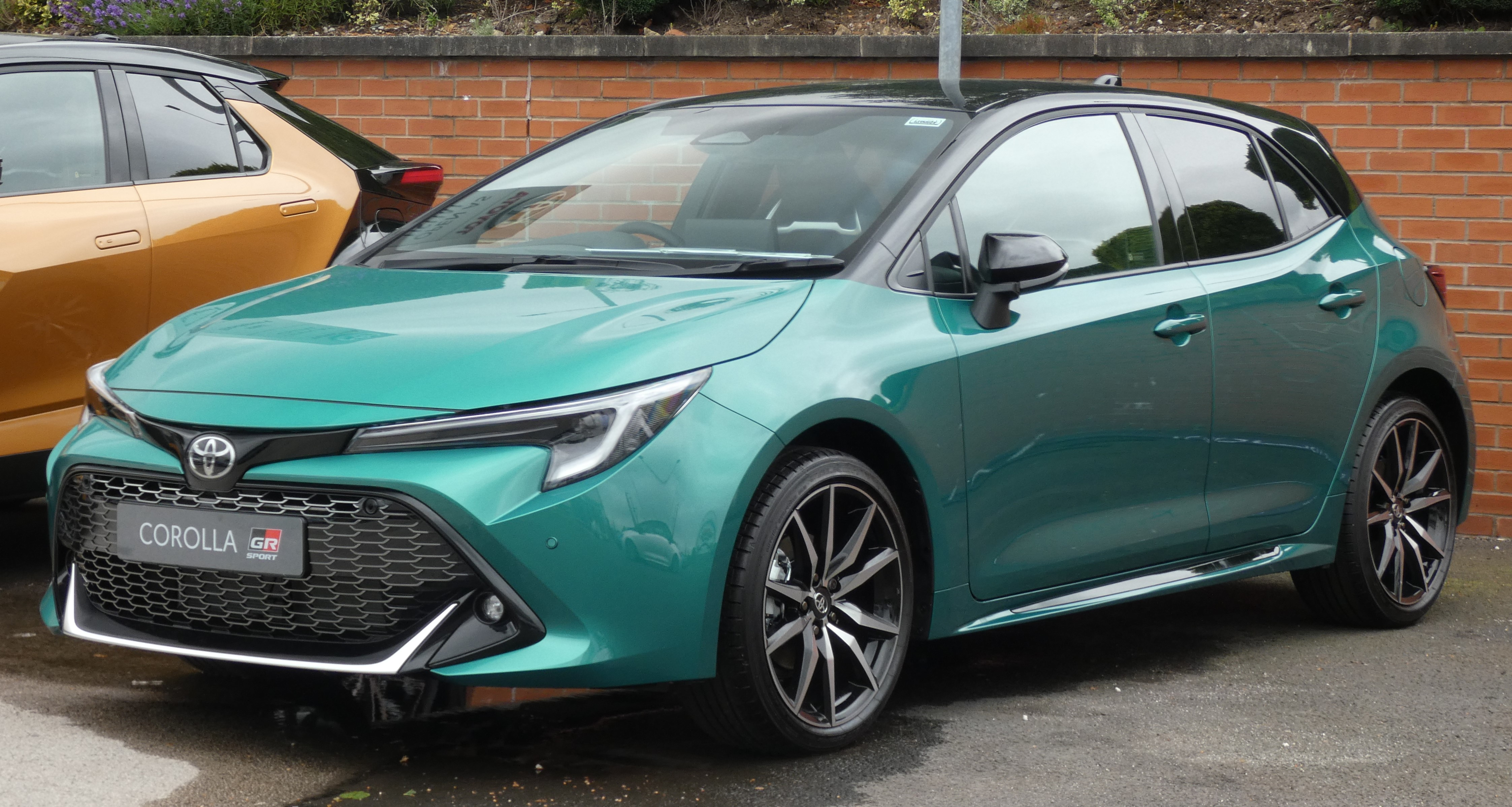
Hatchback (GR Sport; facelift)

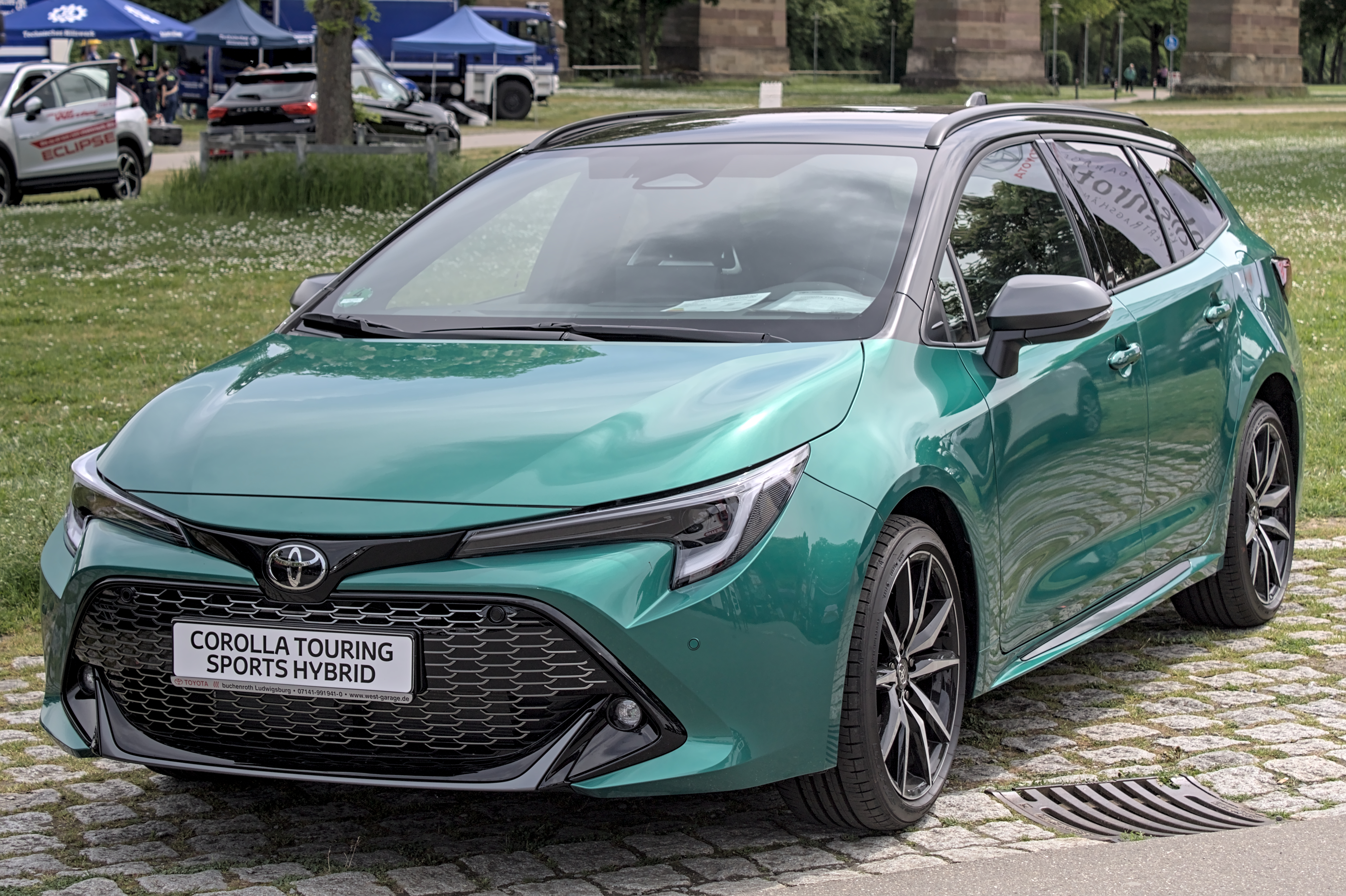
Estate (GR Sport; facelift)

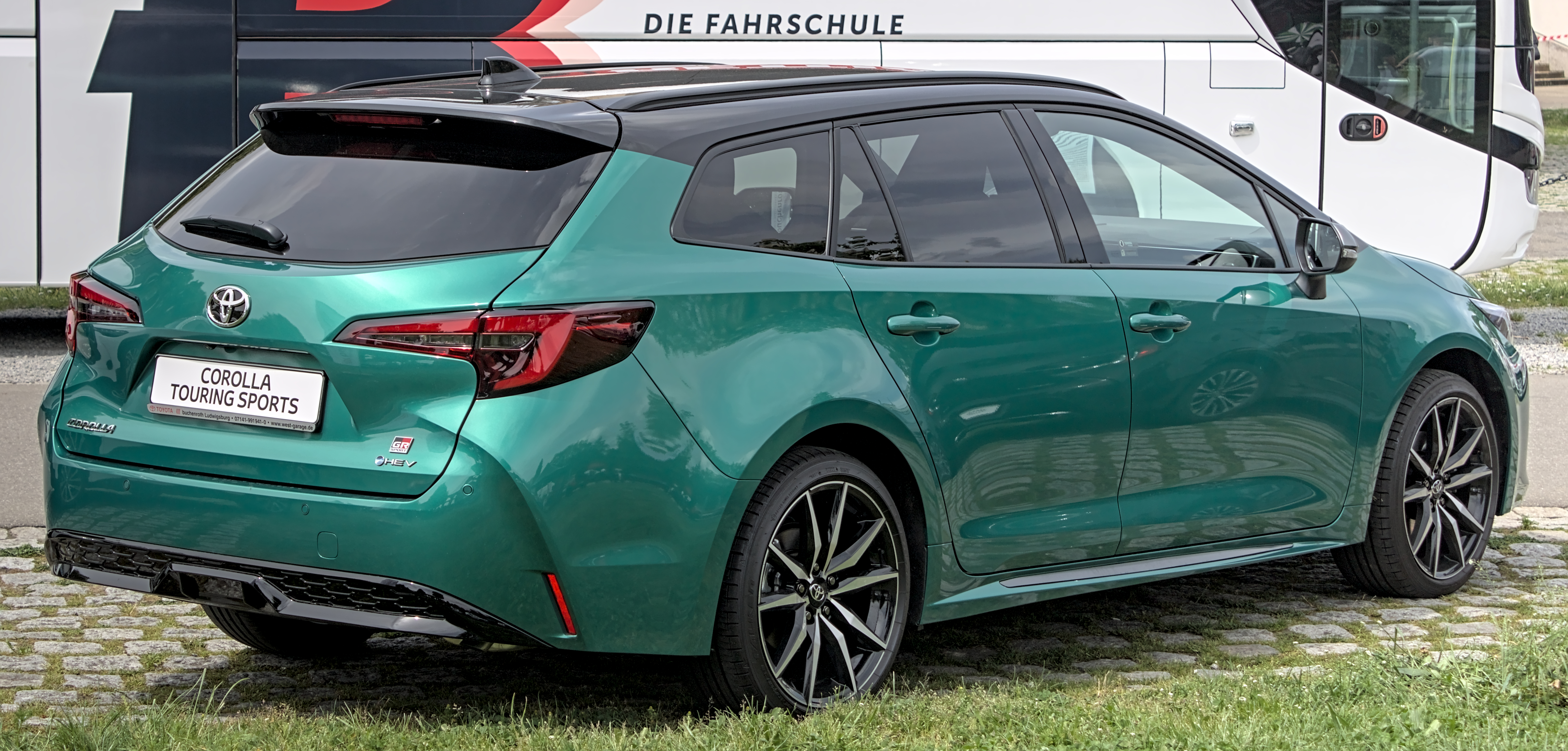
Estate (GR Sport; facelift)

=== North America ===
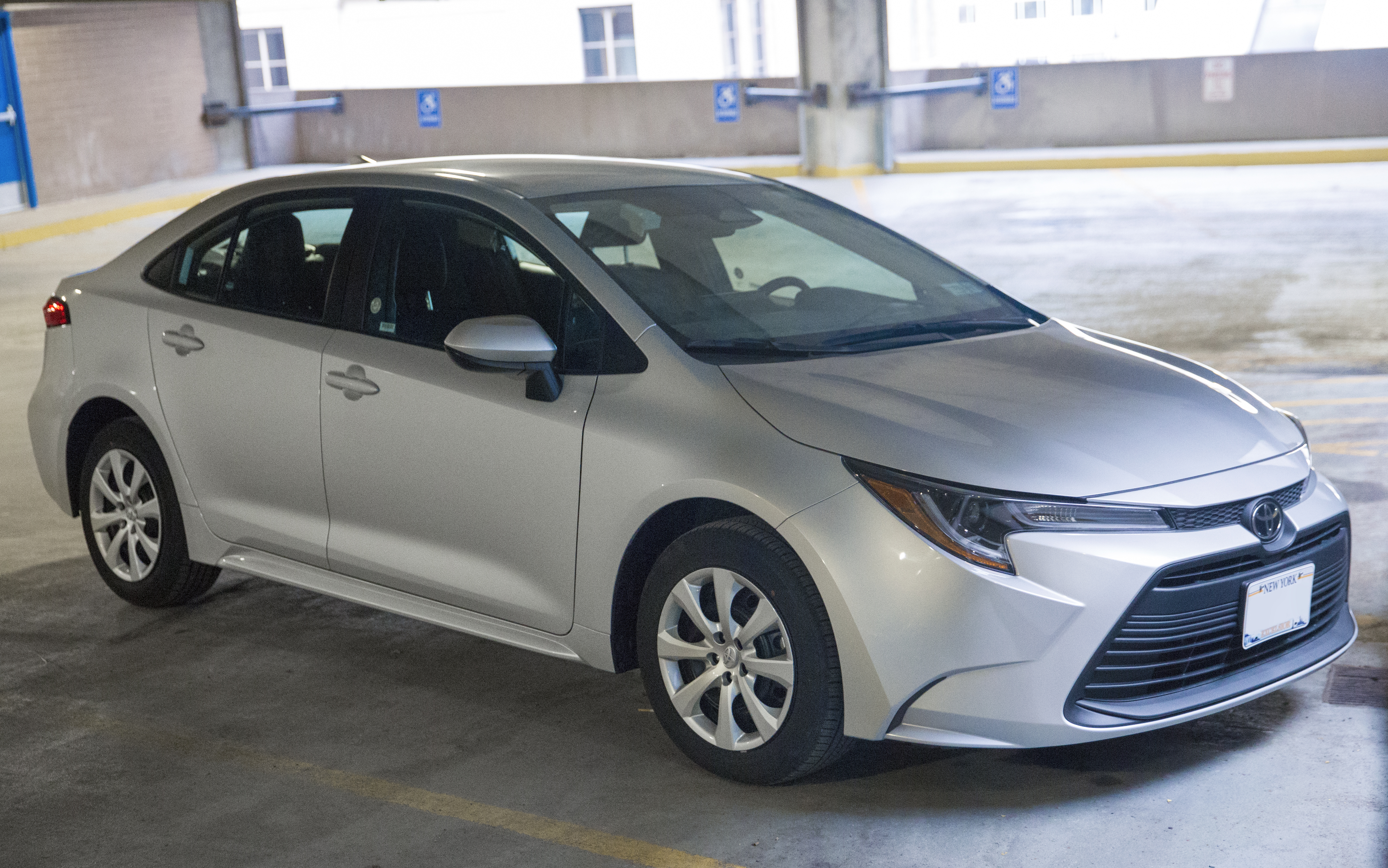
2024 model year Toyota Corolla LE (facelift)

In 2022, Toyota Motors North America announced a facelift for the Corolla for the 2023 model year. The base model L is dropped in the United States for this year moving all US-spec models to include automatic climate control, larger 8-inch touchscreen, remote keyless entry, as well as receiving new exterior styling inspired by the GR Corolla. In Canada, the XLE model is dropped for the 2023 model year. Additionally the LE model includes torsion beam rear suspension compared to the formerly multi-link rear suspension that was standard on all Corollas. Under the bonnet, the LE model received the same powertrain as the SE and XSE trims: the 2.0-litre M20A-FKS Dynamic Force inline four-cylinder engine and the K120 Direct Shift continuously variable transmission with a physical first gear. Hybrid models retained the 1.8-litre 2ZR-FXE inline four-cylinder engine mated to Toyota's Hybrid Synergy Drive, but received a more powerful electric motor–generator and a smaller lithium-ion battery that sits under the rear seat increasing luggage space. Hybrid technology, which was previously only available in a single LE trim, is also offered in SE and XLE trims in the United States, and in SE and XSE trims in Canada, and all hybrid trims are available with all-wheel drive in Canada, with LE and SE trims in the United States also being available in all-wheel drive. All trims have the updated Toyota Safety Sense 3.0 suite of advanced driver-assistance systems and an 8-inch touchscreen with the Toyota Audio Multimedia system capable of Over-the-Air (OTA) updates that debuted on the XK70 series Tundra. The 2023 Corolla lineup went on sale in October 2022.

=== Oceania ===
==== Australia ====
The facelifted Corolla for the Australian market was launched on 8 November 2022. Similar to the pre-facelift model, the grade levels offered are Ascent Sport, SX and ZR with either a 2.0-litre M20A-FKS petrol or a 1.8-litre 2ZR-FXE hybrid petrol engines.

==== New Zealand ====
Toyota New Zealand offers the 2023 facelifted model in estate and hatchback variants. All models are equipped with the 1.8-litre 2ZR-FXE hybrid petrol engine and E-CVT. The estate version is only available in GX trim with four exterior colour choices. The hatchback is available in GX, SX and ZR trims.

== GR Corolla ==
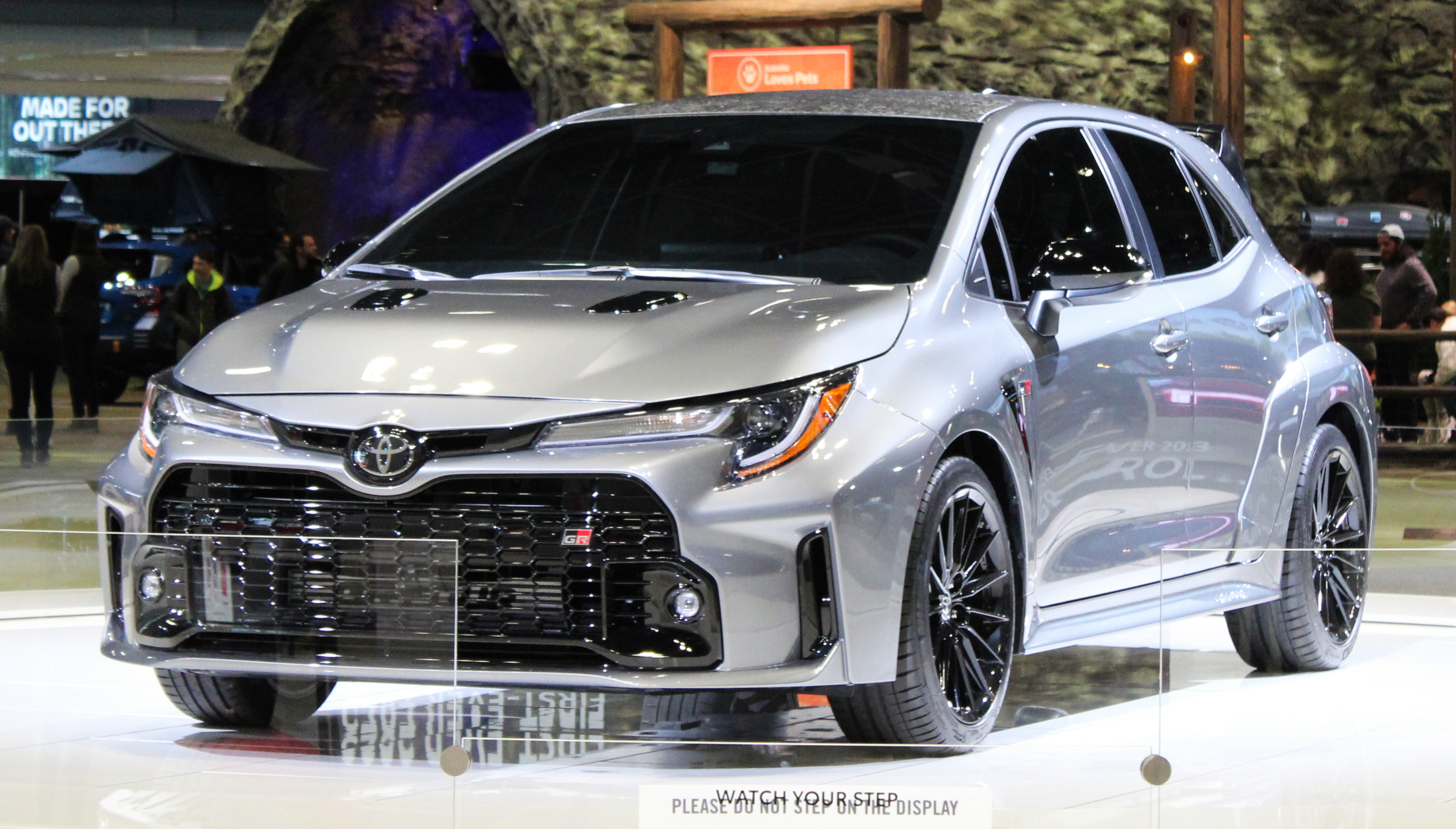
GR Corolla

The GR Corolla is the high-performance variant of the E210 series Corolla, which is only available in hatchback body style. It is built with assistance from the company's Gazoo Racing (GR) division. It was first introduced on 31 March 2022.

The GR Corolla is built mainly for the North American market as Europe received the GR Yaris (which is not sold in North America). The GR Corolla is also sold in Japan, Australia, New Zealand, South Africa, Brazil, Thailand, Malaysia and Indonesia.

== Safety ==
=== ANCAP ===
The Corolla Hatchback in its Australasian market configuration got a five-star safety rating by the Australasian New Car Assessment Program in 2018 (aligned with Euro NCAP).

ANCAP test results* Toyota Corolla all hatch variants (excluding GR) (2018, aligned with Euro NCAP)
Test	Points	%
Overall:	5 /5 stars	
Adult occupant:	36.6	96%
Child occupant:	40.9	83%
Pedestrian:	41.3	86%
Safety assist:	9.9	76%

ANCAP test results* Toyota Corolla all sedan variants (2018, aligned with Euro NCAP)
Test	Points	%
Overall:	5 /5 stars	
Adult occupant:	36.6	96%
Child occupant:	40.9	83%
Pedestrian:	41.3	86%
Safety assist:	9.9	76%

=== ASEAN NCAP ===
ASEAN NCAP test results Toyota Corolla Altis (2019)
Test	Points
Overall:	5 /5 stars
Adult occupant:	46.82
Child occupant:	22.35
Safety assist:	19.29

=== Euro NCAP ===
Euro NCAP test results* Toyota Corolla Hatchback 1.8 (LHD) (2019)
Test	Points	%
Overall:	5 /5 stars	
Adult occupant:	36.1	95%
Child occupant:	41.6	84%
Pedestrian:	41.4	86%
Safety assist:	10.1	77%

=== IIHS ===
On 2 October 2018, the Corolla Hatchback received a "Top Safety Pick Award" but not a "Plus" award because of its lack of good-rated headlamps. The same ratings were also received in 2019 for the 2020 model year Corolla saloon.

IIHS scores (2019 model year - Hatchback)
Small overlap front (driver)	Good	
Small overlap front (passenger)	Good	
Moderate overlap front (original test)	Good	
Side impact (original test)	Good	
Side impact (updated test)	Acceptable	
Roof strength	Good	
Head restraints and seats	Good	
Headlights	Acceptable	Marginal
Front crash prevention: vehicle-to-vehicle	Superior	
Front crash prevention: vehicle-to-pedestrian (day)	Superior	
Child restraint LATCH ease of use	Good+	

=== Latin NCAP ===
The Corolla in its most basic Latin American market configuration with seven airbags received five stars for adult occupants, five stars for toddlers, and Advanced Award from Latin NCAP 2.0 in 2019.

Latin NCAP 2.0 test results Toyota New Corolla + 7 Airbags (2019, based on Euro NCAP 2008)
Test	Points	Stars
Adult occupant:	29.41/34.0	5 /5 stars
Child occupant:	45.00/49.00	5 /5 stars

Latin NCAP 3.0 downgraded it to four in 2024, based on worse units that started entering the market in 2023 from an additional plant:

Latin NCAP 3.5 test results Toyota Corolla + 7 Airbags (2024, similar to Euro NCAP 2017)
Test	Points	%
Overall:	4 /5 stars	
Adult occupant:	29.14	73%
Child occupant:	35.07	72%
Pedestrian:	28.67	60%
Safety assist:	35.08	82%

=== TNCAP ===
TNCAP (1.0) test result Toyota Corolla Altis 'Classic' (petrol) (2023, similar to Euro NCAP 2017)
Test	Points	%
Overall:	5/5 stars	
Adult occupant:	34.889	91%
Child occupant:	40.663	82%
Pedestrian:	35.617	84%
Safety assist:	8.25	68%

Preceded by Corolla (E170/E180) (international); Corolla (E160) (Japan)	Toyota Corolla (E210); 2018–present	Succeeded by N/A
