= Sarabhai =

Sarabhai is a surname, and may refer to:

- Ambalal Sarabhai (1890–1967), Indian industrialist
- Anasuya Sarabhai (1885–1972), Indian women's labour movement pioneer
- Gautam Sarabhai (1917–1995), industrialist and businessman
- Gira Sarabhai (1923–2021), Indian architect and designer
- Gita Sarabhai (1922–2011), Indian musician
- Kamalini Sarabhai (1925–1981), clinician and psychoanalyst
- Kartikeya Sarabhai, grandson of Ambalal
- Mallika Sarabhai (born 1954), Indian activist, classical dancer and actress
- Mridula Sarabhai (1911–1974), Indian independence activist and politician
- Mrinalini Sarabhai (1918–2016), Indian classical dancer
- Revanta Sarabhai (born 1984), Indian actor and dancer
- Shagun Sarabhai (born 1987), Indian beauty queen
- Vikram Sarabhai (1919–1971), Indian physicist and astronomer

== See also ==
- Sarabhai family
- Sarabhai vs Sarabhai, an Indian sitcom
