= Sarabhai family =

Indian industrialists (c.1820–c.2000)

The Sarabhai family is a prominent Indian family active in several fields. The patriarch, Ambalal Sarabhai, was a leading industrialist. While he created significant wealth, his children interested themselves in a wide variety of other endeavours, and the family is better known for those activities, rather than for their industrial enterprise. The family's business activities continue through Ambalal Sarabhai Enterprises.

== Family history ==
The Sarabhai family are a major business family in India belonging to the Shrimal Jain Bania community. Its twentieth century patriarch, Sheth Ambalal Sarabhai, was a Jain industrialist. He had five daughters and three sons who were involved in the family business as well as the Indian independence movement. After India's independence, the family remained involved in developmental tasks undertaken by the Government of India.

Ambalal Sarabhai was a prominent mill owner and also interested in philanthropic activities. His wife Sarladevi Sarabhai was impressed by the Maria Montessori philosophy and in the year 1922, Montessori sent E. M. Standing to India for the homeschooling of Sarabhai children.

Sarabhai Enterprises branched out after India's independence and many pioneer ventures were made in fields dominated by foreign companies. The manufacture of drugs and pharmaceuticals, chemicals and intermediates, dyes and pigments, industrial and household detergents, soaps and cosmetics, industrial packaging and containers, and later engineering and electronic products.

== Family members ==
Prominent members of the Sarabhai family include:

- Ambalal Sarabhai. Patriarch of the family. Born into a family of tradesmen, he invested the family wealth into various industrial enterprises in the early 1900s, including Sarabhai Textile Mills at Ahmedabad, which was one of the largest in India at that time.
- Anasuya Sarabhai (sister of Ambalal Sarabhai), a trade unionist, activist and freedom fighter. Married young, she never cohabited with her husband.
- Saraladevi Sarabhai (wife of Ambalal Sarabhai) and the mother of his eight children (three sons and five daughters)
  - Suhrid Sarabhai Sr. (son of Ambalal Sarabhai), industrialist
    - Manorama Sarabhai (wife of Suhrid Sarabhai), commissioned Villa Sarabhai
    - Anand Sarabhai (son of Suhrid Sr), molecular biologist, partner of Lynda Benglis, American sculptor and visual artist
    - Suhrid Sarabhai Jr (son of Suhrid Sr), industrialist
      - Asha Sarabhai, wife of Suhrid Jr, clothing designer
    - Sanjay Sarabhai (son of Suhrid Jr)
    - Samir Sarabhai (son of Suhrid Jr)
  - Gautam Sarabhai (son of Ambalal Sarabhai), industrialist, philanthropist, co founder & the architect of the National Institute of Design, Ahmedabad
    - Kamalini Sarabhai (wife of Gautam Sarabhai), co founder of B.M. Institute of Mental Health
    - Mana Sarabhai Brearley (daughter of Gautam Sarabhai)
      - Mischa Gorchov Brearley (son of Mana Sarabhai Brearley with artist Robert Gorchov)
      - Lara Brearley (daughter of Mana Sarabhai Brearley with Mike Brearley)
    - Shyama Gautam Sarabhai (daughter of Gautam Sarabhai)
      - Anand Zaveri (husband of Shyama Gautam Sarabhai)
        - Shaan Zaveri (son of Shyama Gautam Sarabhai with Anand Zaveri), real estate developer in Ahmedabad
        - Neel Zaveri (son of Shyama Gautam Sarabhai with Anand Zaveri)
  - Mridula Sarabhai (daughter of Ambalal Sarabhai), Indian independence activist and politician; unmarried
  - Vikram Sarabhai (son of Ambalal Sarabhai), co-founder of ISRO and IIM Ahmedabad
    - Mrinalini Sarabhai (wife of Vikram Sarabhai), dancer
    - Kartikeya Sarabhai (son of Vikram Sarabhai), educationist and environmentalist is married to Dr Prithi Nambiar, author, academic and Senior Program Director, CEE
      - Rajshree Sarabhai (former wife of Kartikeya Sarabhai), writer and director of Rajka Designs, a textile design studio
      - Samvit Sarabhai (son of Kartikeya Sarbhai), current director of Rajka Designs
      - Mohal Sarabhai (son of Kartikeya Sarbhai), managing director of Asence Pharma Pvt. Ltd., and Synbiotics Limited (a Sarabhai Family company incorporated in 1960)
        - Christina Sarabhai (wife of Mohal Sarabhai)
        - Kavan Sarabhai (son of Mohal and Christina Sarabhai)
    - Mallika Sarabhai (daughter of Vikram Sarabhai), a dancer and activist; briefly married to Bipin Shah, a publisher
      - Revanta Sarabhai (son of Mallika Sarabhai and Bipin Shah), dancer
      - Anahita Sarabhai (daughter of Mallika Sarabhai), performance artist & co-founder of QueerAbad
  - Leena Mangaldas (daughter of Ambalal Sarabhai), founder of Shreyas Foundation.
    - Madanmohan Mangaldas Girdhardas (husband of Leena Mangaldas), noted industrialist
    - Kamal Mangaldas (son of Leena Mangaldas), noted architect
      - Arjun Mangaldas (son of Kamal Mangaldas), architect
      - Abhay Mangaldas (son of Kamal Mangaldas), hotelier, founder of House of MG, a heritage hotel in Ahmedabad
  - Gira Sarabhai (daughter of Ambalal Sarabhai), co-founder of the National Institute of Design, the Calico Museum of Textiles
  - Gita Mayor (daughter of Ambalal Sarabhai), Indian musician; well known for her patronage in music
    - Satyadev Mayor, (husband of Gita Mayor)
    - Pallavi Satyadev Mayor (daughter of Gita Mayor)
      - Ajay Mayor (son of Pallavi Mayor)
  - Bharti Sarabhai, (daughter of Ambalal Sarabhai), unmarried

== Institutions built by Sarabhai family ==
1. Calico Mills - Ambalal Sarabhai
2. Jubilee Mills - Ambalal Sarabhai
3. Kasturba Gandhi Rashtriya Smarak Trust - Sarladevi Ambalal Sarabhai
4. Majoor Mahajan - Anasuyaben Sarabhai
5. Jyoti Sangh - Mridulaben Sarabhai
6. Vikas Gruh - Mridulaben Sarabhai
7. Shreyas Foundation & School - Leenaben Mangaldas
8. B.M. Institute of Mental Health - Gautam Sarabhai
9. The Psychotherapy Study Group - Gautam Sarabhai
10. National Institute of Design - Gautam Sarabhai and Gira Sarabhai
11. Darpana Academy of Performing Arts - Mrinalini & Vikram Sarabhai
12. Calico Museum of Textiles - Gira Sarabhai
13. Ambalal Sarabhai Enterprises, Baroda - Gautam Sarabhai, a commercial (corporate) venture
14. Centre for Environment Education - Kartikeya Sarabhai
15. VIKSAT - Kartikeya Sarabhai
16. CHETNA - Kartikeya Sarabhai
17. Sangeet Kendra - Geeta Mayor
18. Darpana for Development - Mallika Sarabhai
19. Mapin Publishing - Mallika Sarabhai and her husband Bipin Shah
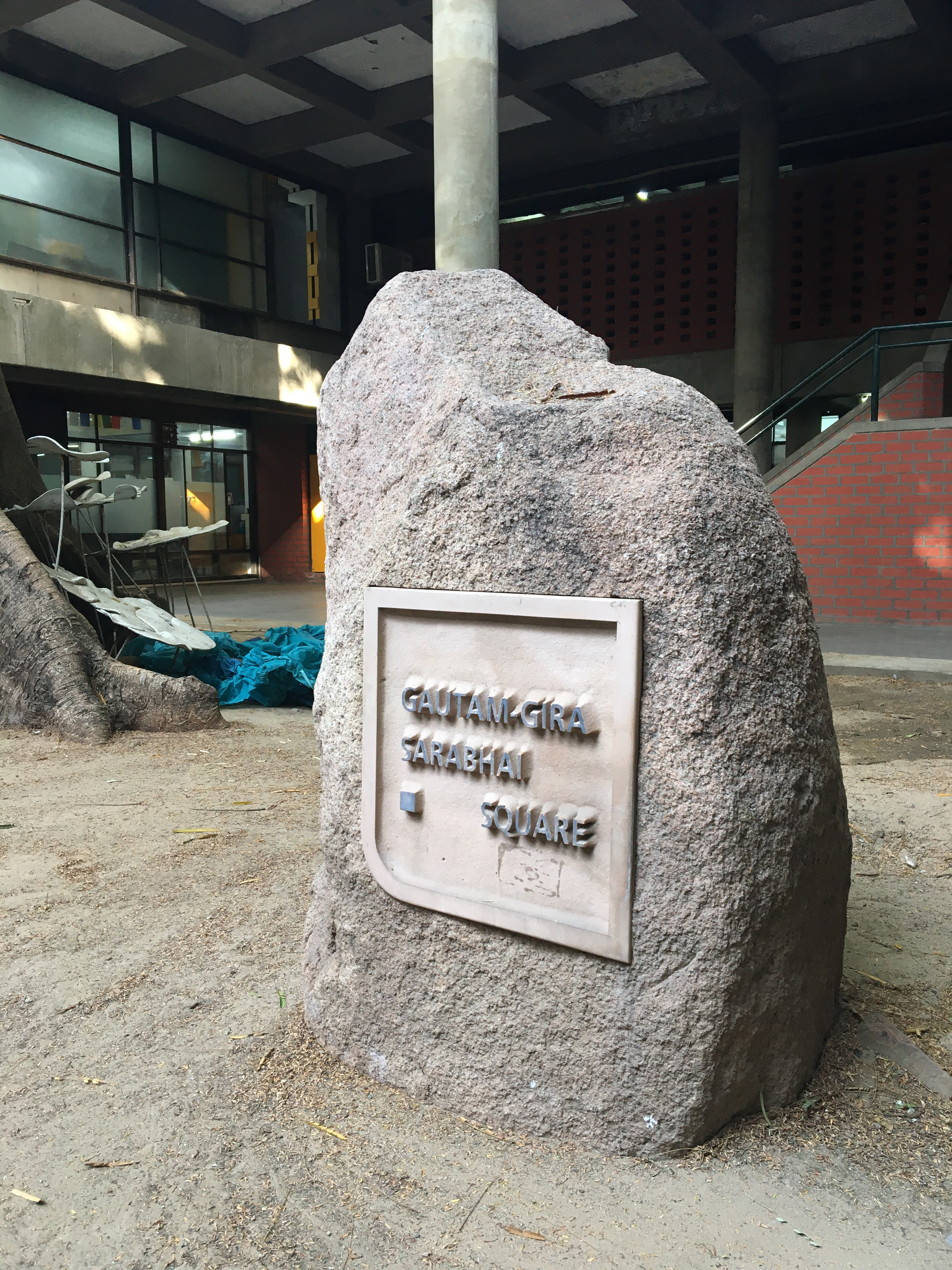
  Gautam Gira Sarabhai Square, National Institute of Design, Ahmedabad. Earlier known as Nayak Square.

== Major institution building efforts of Vikram Sarabhai (1947-1971) ==
1. Ahmedabad Textile Industry's Research Association (ATIRA)
2. Physical Research Laboratory (PRL), Ahmedabad
3. Indian Institute of Management Ahmedabad
4. Community Science Centre (CSC), Ahmedabad
5. Nehru Foundation for Development (NFD), Ahmedabad
6. Ahmedabad Management Association (AMA), Ahmedabad
7. Sarabhai Chemicals, Baroda
8. Sarabhai Glass, Baroda
9. Suhrid Geigy, Baroda
10. Synbiotics, Baroda
11. Sarabhai Merck, Baroda
12. Sarabhai Engineering Group, Baroda
13. Operations Research Group (ORG), Baroda
14. Sarabhai Research Centre (SRC), Baroda
15. Systronics, Ahmedabad
16. Swastik Oil Mills, Bombay
17. Standard Pharmaceuticals, Calcutta
18. Thumba Equatorial Rocket Launching Station (TERLS), Trivandrum
19. Space Science and Technology Centre (SSTC), Trivandrum
20. Shriharikota Rocket Range (SHAR), Sriharikota
21. Experimental Satellite Communication Earth Station (ESCES), Ahmedabad
22. Satellite Communication System Division (SCSD), Ahmedabad
23. Electronics System Division (ESD), Ahmedabad
24. Microwave Antenna Systems Engineering Group (MASEG), Ahmedabad
25. Audio Visual Instructional Division (AVID), Ahmedabad
26. Remote Sensing and Meteorological Division (RSMD), Ahmedabad
27. Indian Scientific Satellite Project (ISSP), Bangalore
28. Satellite Instructional Television Experiment (SITE), Ahmedabad
29. Indian National Satellite (INSAT) Satellite Launching Vehicle (SLV) Trivandrum
30. Satellite Communication Earth Station,
31. Arvi Fast Breeder Reactors (FBR), Kalpakkam
32. Nuclear Centre for Agriculture, New Delhi
33. Variable Energy Cyclotron Project (VECP), Calcutta
34. Electronic Prototype Engineering Laboratory (EPEL), Bombay
35. Electronics Corporation of India (ECIL), Hyderabad
36. Uranium Corporation of India (UCIL), Jaduguda, Jharkhand

No.4 was renamed the Vikram A. Sarabhai Community Science Centre after Dr. Sarabhai’s death in 1971. No.18 & 19 were merged under the Vikram Sarabhai Space Centre after Dr. Sarabhai’s death in 1971. Nos.21,22,23,24,25 and 26 were merged under the Space Applications Centre after Dr. Sarabhai’s death in 1971. No. 31 was renamed Vikram Earth Station after Dr. Sarabhai’s death in 1971.

Various photographs of Sarabhais collected/photographed by Nathan Hughes Hamilton (Squibb - Sarabhai Chemicals) in early 1950s, Baroda, Ahmedabad and Bombay

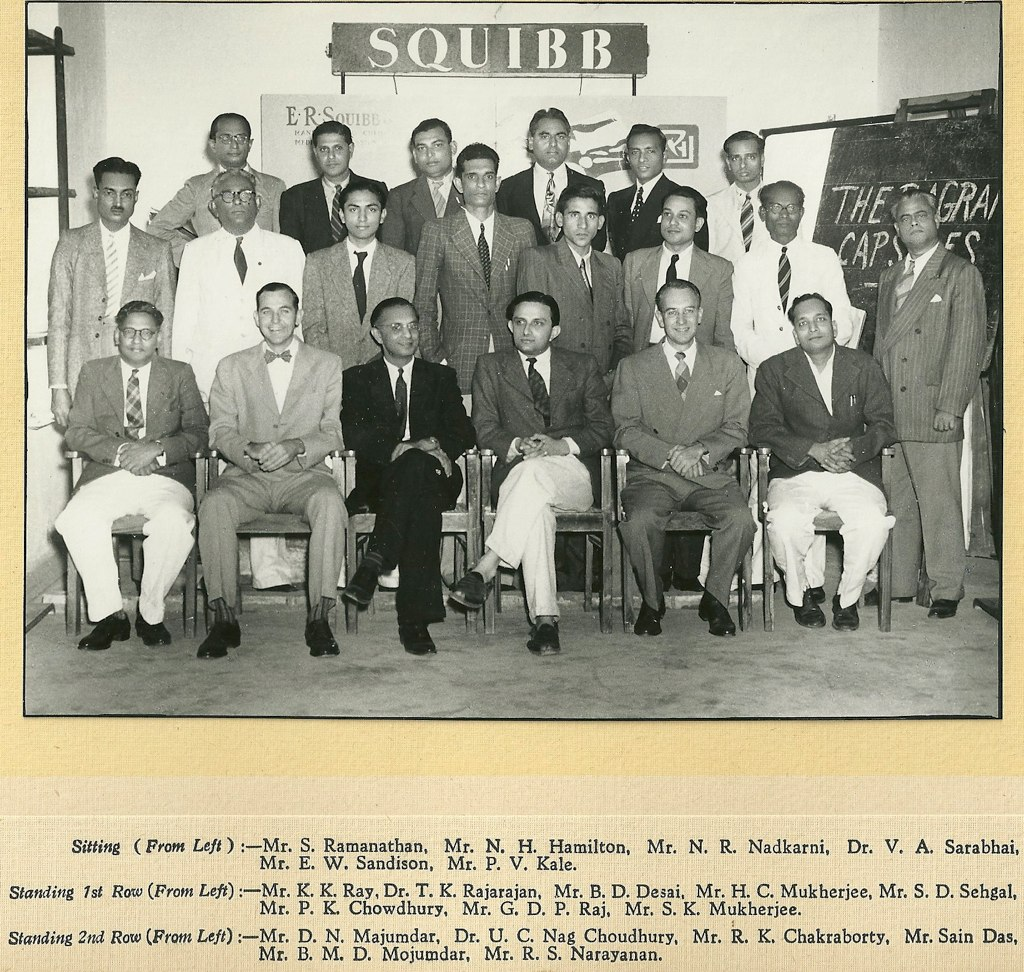
Vikram Sarabhai

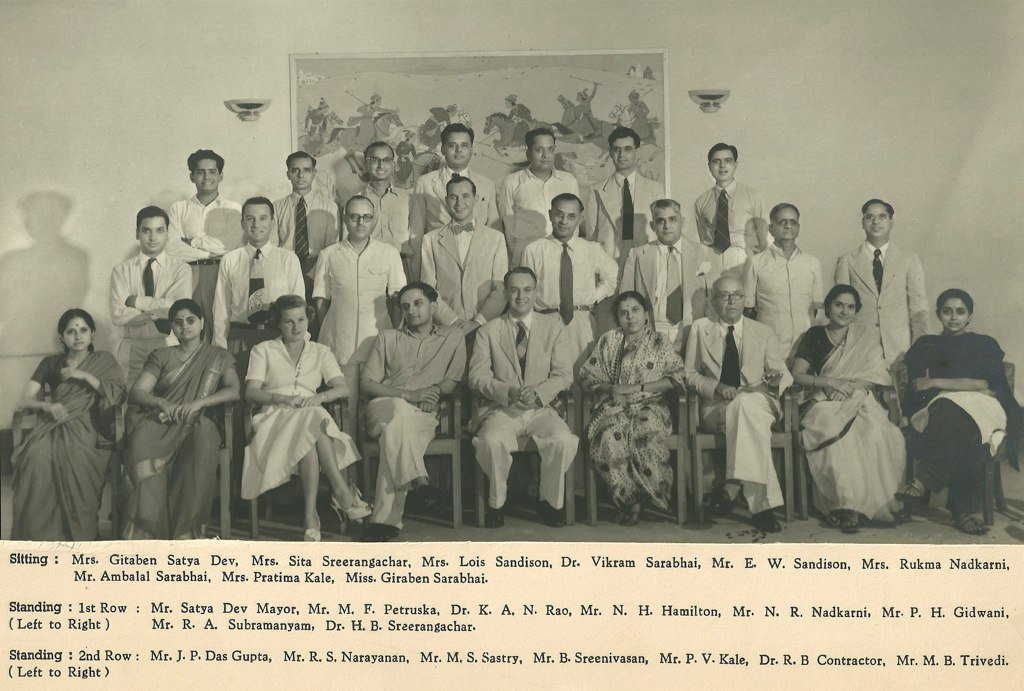
Seated Gita Sarabhai Mayor, Vikram Sarabhai and Gira Sarabhai.

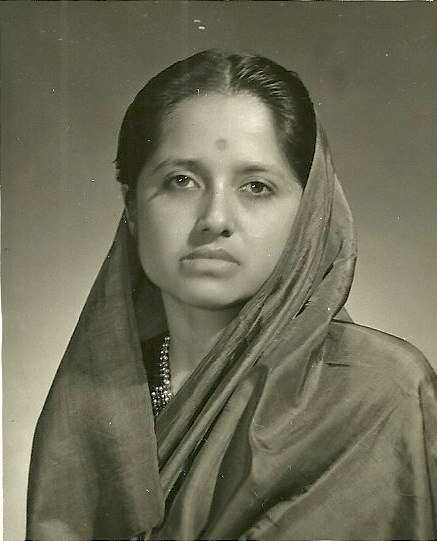
Gita Sarabhai Mayor

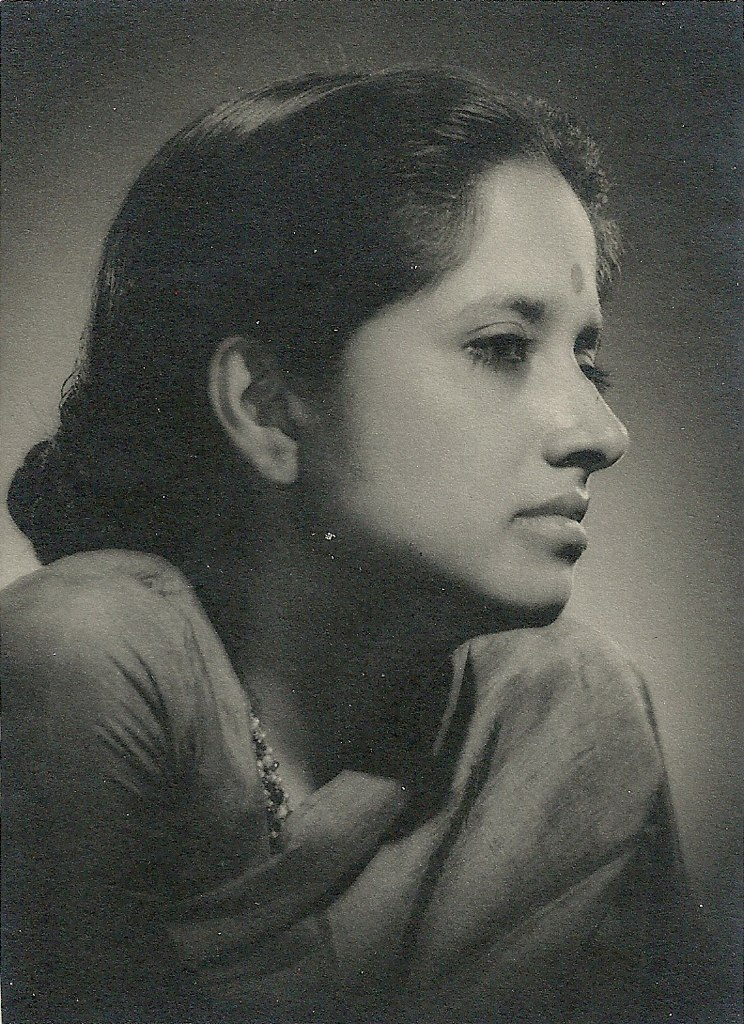
Gita Sarabhai Mayor

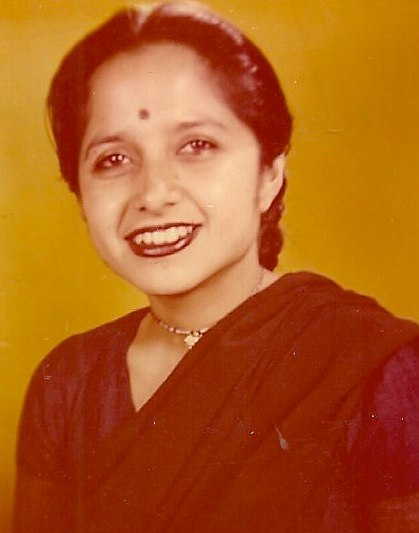
Gita Sarabhai Mayor

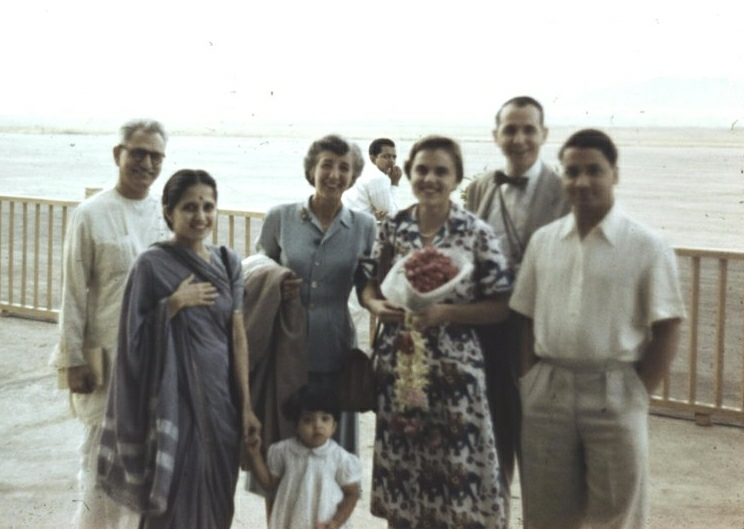

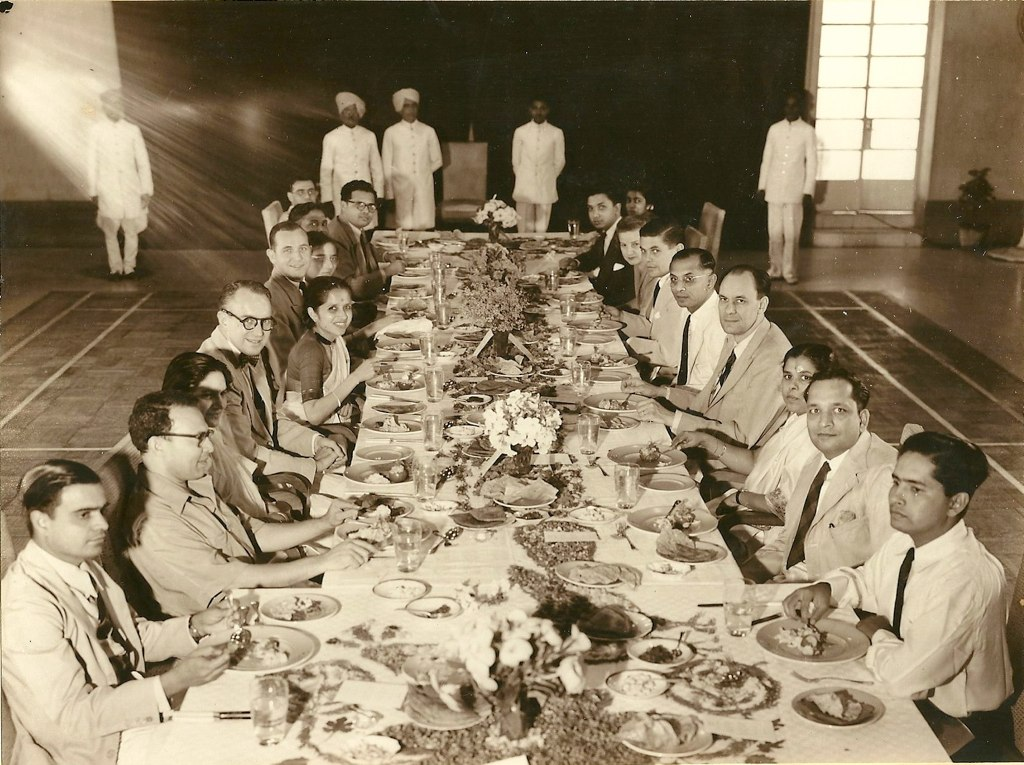
Seated fifth from left, Gita sarabhai Mayor

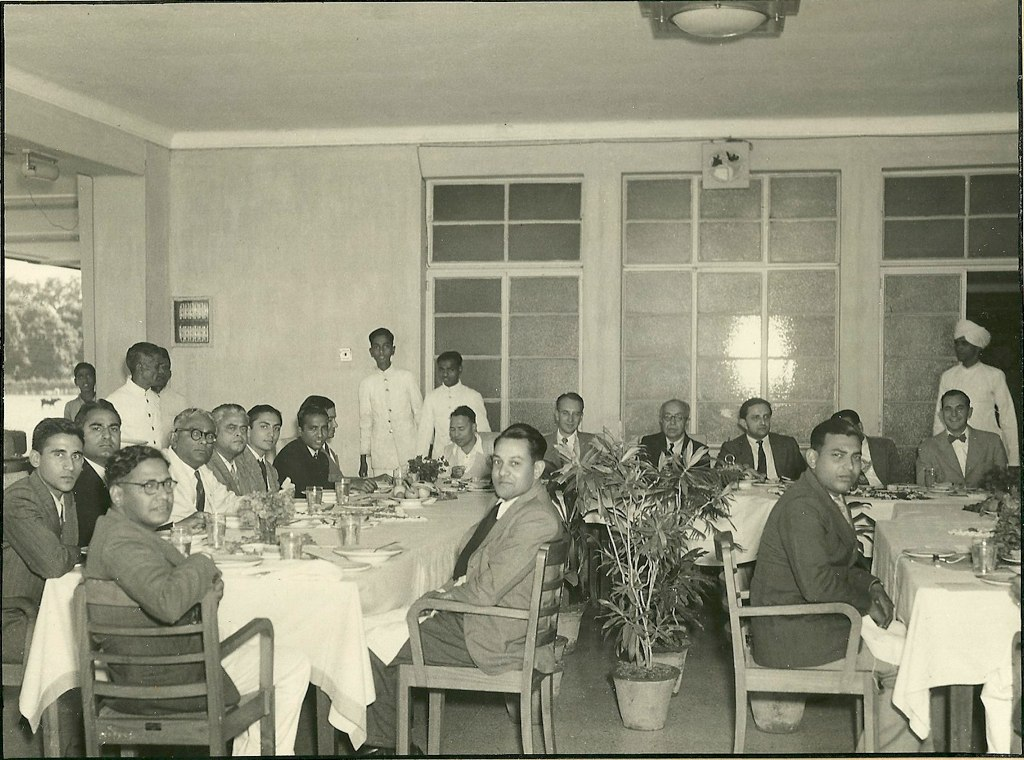
Ambalal Sarabhai can be spotted at the back close to the glass windows/doors.

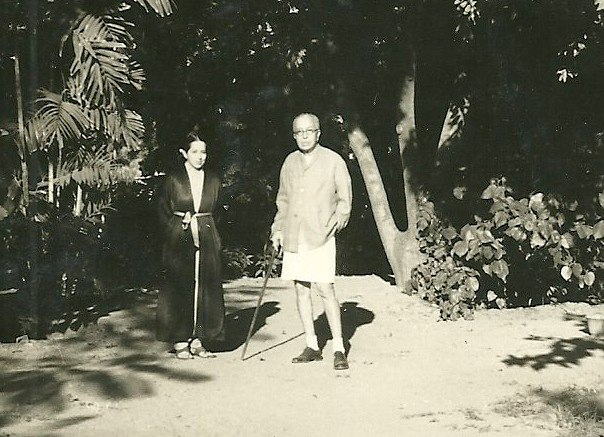
Gita and Ambalal Sarabhai

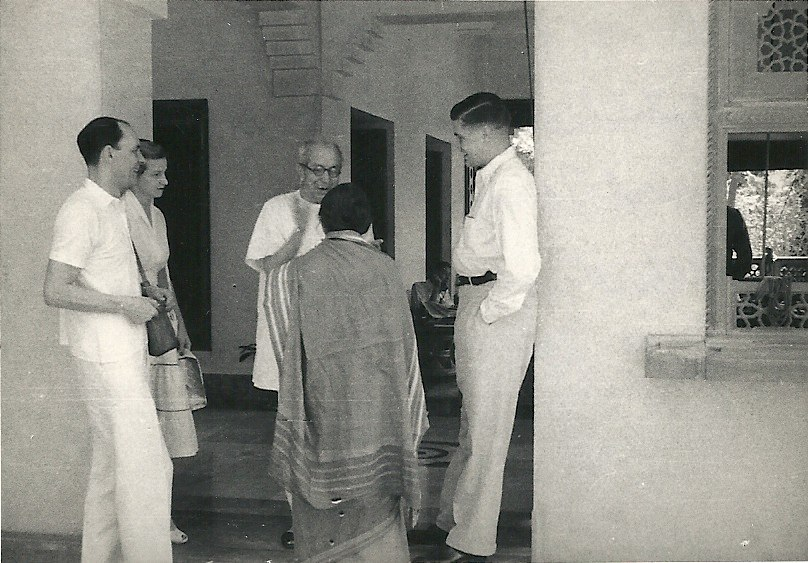
Ambalal Sarabhai and Saraladevi Sarabhai (back towards the camera)

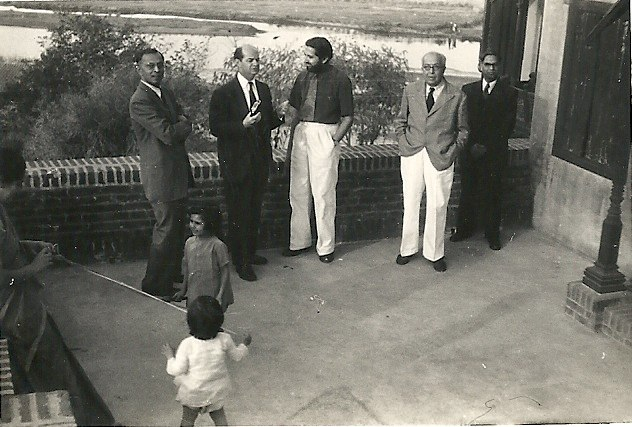
Gautam Sarabhai wearing half shirt and tie, third from the left standing next to his father Ambalal Sarabhai

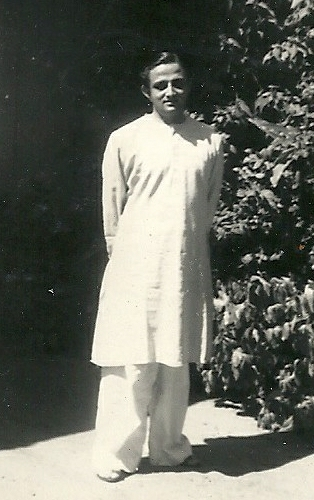
A young Vikram Sarabhai

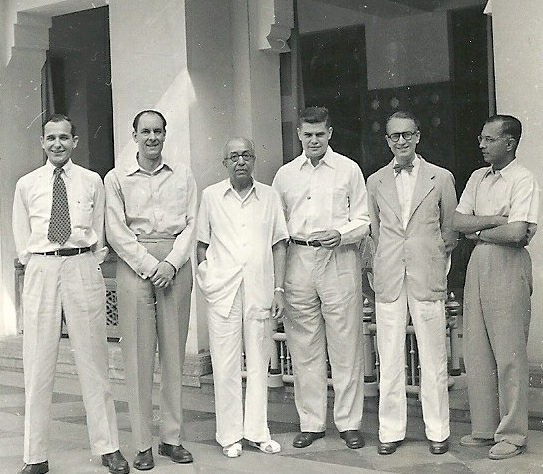
Ambalal Sarabhai third from left. First from left is Nathan Hughes Hamilton, an employee at Squibb- Sarabhai Chemicals, Baroda.

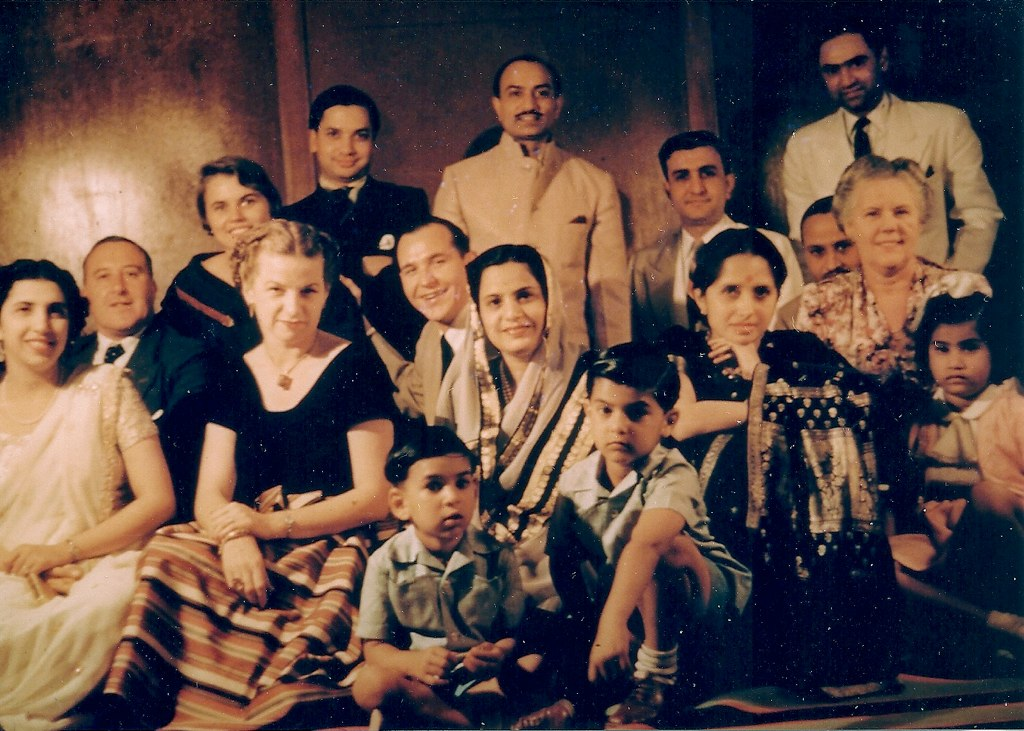
Gita Sarabhai Mayor in black saree wearing a bindi, on the right.

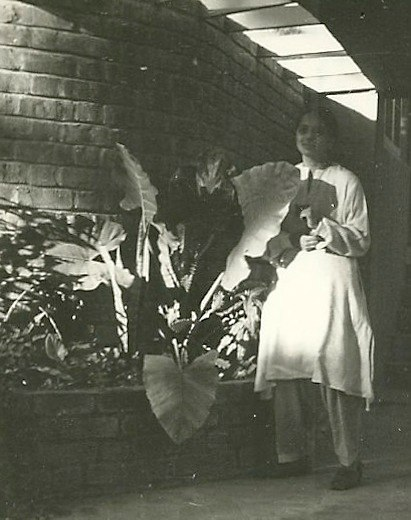
Gira Sarabhai probably at Calico Museum of Textiles

== See also ==
- Anusyabehn Sarabhai
- Jainism
- Swaminathan family
- Calico Museum of Textiles
- Mill Owners' Association Building
- National Institute of Design
- ISRO
- Gira Sarabhai
- Gautam Sarabhai
- Vikram Sarabhai
- Mrinalini Sarabhai
