= Mridula Sarabhai =

Indian independence activist and politician (1911 – 1974)

Mridula Sarabhai (6 May 1911 – 26 October 1974) was an Indian independence activist and politician. She was a member of the Sarabhai industrialist family of Ahmedabad.

== Early life ==
Mridula was born in Ahmedabad, India to an affluent business family. She was one of eight children of Ambalal Sarabhai and Sarla Devi, and a sister of Vikram Sarabhai. She was home-schooled by a succession of British and Indian teachers under the supervision of her parents. In 1928, she was enrolled for college education at Gujarat Vidyapeeth but dropped out the following year, ostensibly in order to participate in the Salt Satyagraha. At a young age, she heeded Gandhi's call to boycott foreign goods and institutions, and is said to have refused for this reason to go abroad to study.

== Congresswoman and Freedom fighter ==
At an early age, Mridula came under the influence of Mahatma Gandhi. As a child of ten, she worked with the Vanara Sena ("Monkey Army" – a group of child activists organised by Indira Gandhi) of the Congress and carried messages and water for the satyagrahis. Influenced by Jawaharlal Nehru, who was to become her mentor, she helped with the organization of the Youth Conference in Rajkot in 1927. She joined the Congress Seva Dal during the Salt Satyagraha and organized the boycott of foreign cloth and British goods. She was even imprisoned by British for her role in salt satyagraha.

In 1934, she was elected to the All India Congress Committee as a delegate from Gujarat. However, in subsequent years her independent stances caused friction with other leaders from the state. When the party refused to nominate her, she contested as an independent and won with the largest margin of votes.

She played a significant role in the organizational machinery of the Congress, heading its women's wing. She was appointed the Secretary, Sub Committee on Women's Role in the Planned Economy for the National Planning Board. The report was later used by early legislators during the drafting of the Constitution and the first few budgets.

In 1946, Pandit Nehru appointed her as one of the General Secretaries of the Congress party and a member of the Congress Working Committee. She resigned and followed Gandhiji to Noakhali when riots broke out. During the turbulent year of Partition of India, she took active lead in restoring communal amity and harmony, firstly at Patna, where she was attending the flag hoisting ceremony on 15 August 1947, with permission from Gandhiji. When she heard of riots being broken in Punjab, she immediately contacted Nehru and later rushed there to take active role in peace keeping. Her role in preserving communal harmony during the violence of partition was praised by leaders from India and Pakistan.

However, some years after independence of India, she became disillusioned with Congress. In later years, she became an ardent and vocal supporter of Sheikh Abdullah outside Kashmir, her long-time friend. She even funded his expenses for fighting Kashmir Conspiracy Case, for which Abdullah was imprisoned. Later, even she, herself, was imprisoned several months without trial over the Kashmir case, although, she was never charged of conspiracy.

== See also ==
- Sarabhai family
