= Kartikeya Sarabhai =

Indian environmentalist

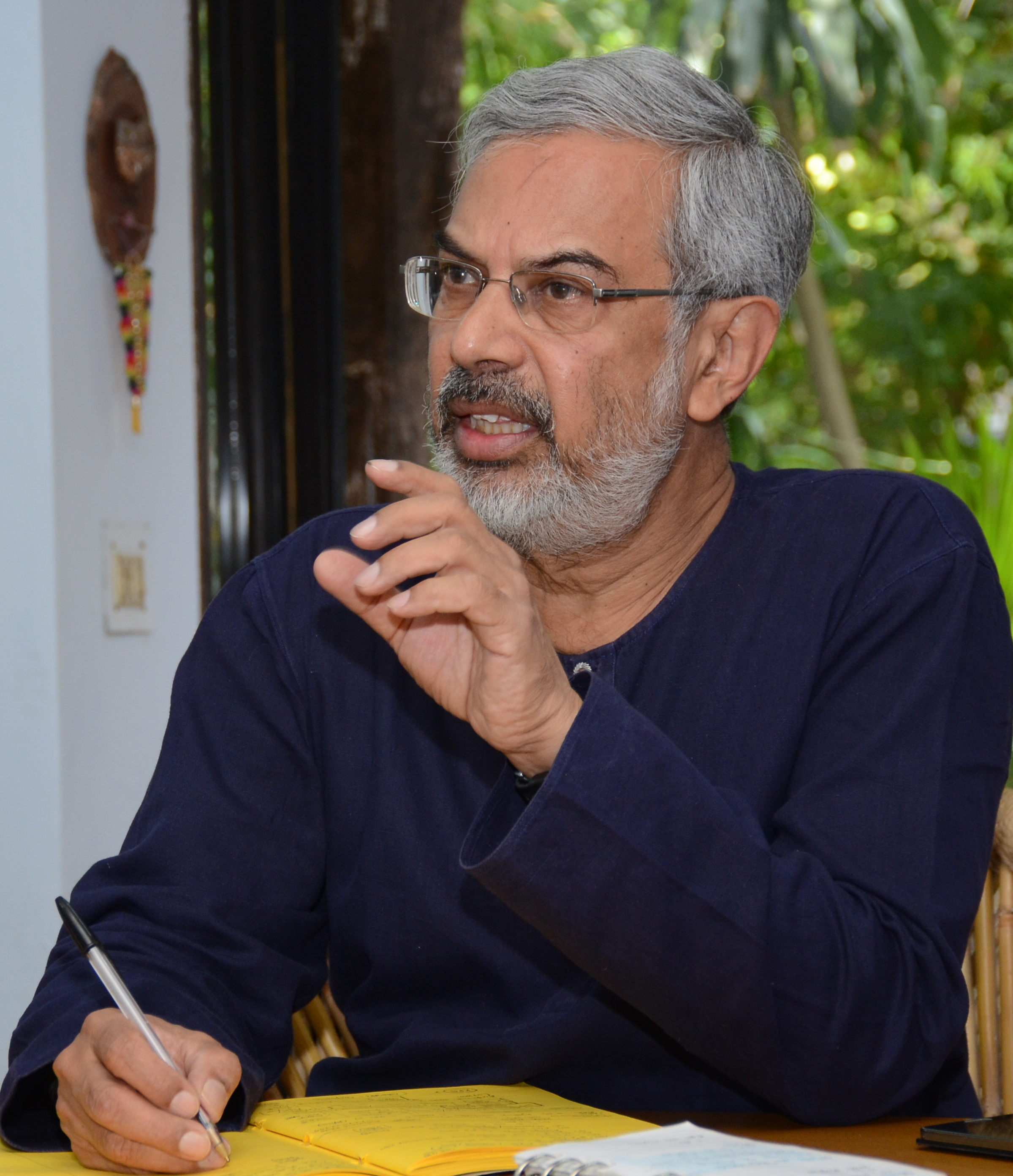
- Born: Kartikeya Vikram Sarabhai; 27 November 1947 (age 78); Ahmedabad, Bombay State, India
- Known for: Pioneering efforts in environmental education
- Title: Founder and director, CEE; Chairman of Ambalal Sarabhai Enterprises
- Parents: Vikram Sarabhai (father); Mrinalini Sarabhai (mother)
- Family: see Sarabhai family
- Awards: Padma Shri (2012)

Kartikeya Vikram Sarabhai (born 27 November 1947) is an environmental educator. He was awarded the Padma Shri, India's fourth-highest civilian award, in 2012.

== Biography ==
Kartikeya Sarabhai was born in Sarabhai family of Ahmedabad, is the grandson of industrialist Ambalal Sarabhai. His father, Dr. Vikram Sarabhai, is widely regarded as the father of India's space programme. Both his mother, Mrinalini Sarabhai, and his sister, Mallika Sarabhai, are Bharatanatyam dancers and social activists.

Sarabhai was educated at Cambridge, UK, where he acquired a Tripos in Natural Sciences. He then went on to do post-graduate work in development communication at the Massachusetts Institute of Technology (MIT) in the USA. He took over as Chairman of Ambalal Sarabhai Enterprises Ltd in 1995, a pharmaceutical company set up by his grandfather Ambalal Sarabhai. At the time the company was financially stressed with a large workforce and major Court issues. Kartikeya Sarabhai developed a plan to restructure the company and put it back on a growth path. Through monetizing intellectual property and selling some of its land he managed to clear outstanding dues, reduced the large workforce, got one of its company out of BIFR and also cleared the company's name with the Banks. He got in new technologies in the pharmaceutical and electronics divisions. With patience and perseverance he not only got ASE out of debts but also got independent units working efficiently taking the business ahead. His main concern was to clear all issues and strengthen ASE. Today the company is on a growth path and the formation of two new joint ventures namely Vovantis and Cosara have brought in exciting new technologies for the future.

Sarabhai is the founder and director of the Centre for Environment Education headquartered in Ahmedabad, with offices across India. He is closely involved in the activities of the Nehru Foundation for Development, of VIKSAT and of Ahmedabad's Vikram Sarabhai Community Science Centre. He is also a trustee of the Sabarmati Ashram Preservation and Memorial Trust, and of the Physical Research Laboratory (PRL).

He has served on many committees set up by the Ministry of Environment and Forests and Ministry of Human Resource Development of the Government of India, primarily focusing on the greening of India's formal education system, and initiatives for biodiversity education. He is a member of the Earth Charter International Council and was part of the delegations which represented India at the Earth Summit (1992) in Rio and the Earth Summit 2002 in Johannesburg. He was instrumental in initiating the South and Southeast Asia Network for Environmental Education (SASEANEE). He is currently vice-chairman of the Indian National Commission for the International Union Conservation of Nature (IUCN). He also led the first international conference on the UN Decade of Education for Sustainable Development in Ahmedabad in 2005, and he is a member of the UNESCO Reference Group for DESD and the International Steering Committee for the end of the Decade Conference. He is a member of the advisory committee of the National Council of Education Research and Training (NCERT) and the Chair of the Earth Charter International (ECI) Council.

Sarabhai was the co-chair of the Global Citizenship Working Group of the Learning Metrics Task Force 2.0 convened by the Centre for Universal Education at Brookings Institution to examine how global citizenship education is measured and make recommendations for new ways of assessing learning. He was the chair-holder of the UNESCO Chair on Education for Sustainable Development and the Human Habitat. He is the editor of the Journal of Education for Sustainable Development, published by SAGE, and has written and spoken extensively on environment, education, and sustainable development-related subjects in national and international fora.

== Awards ==
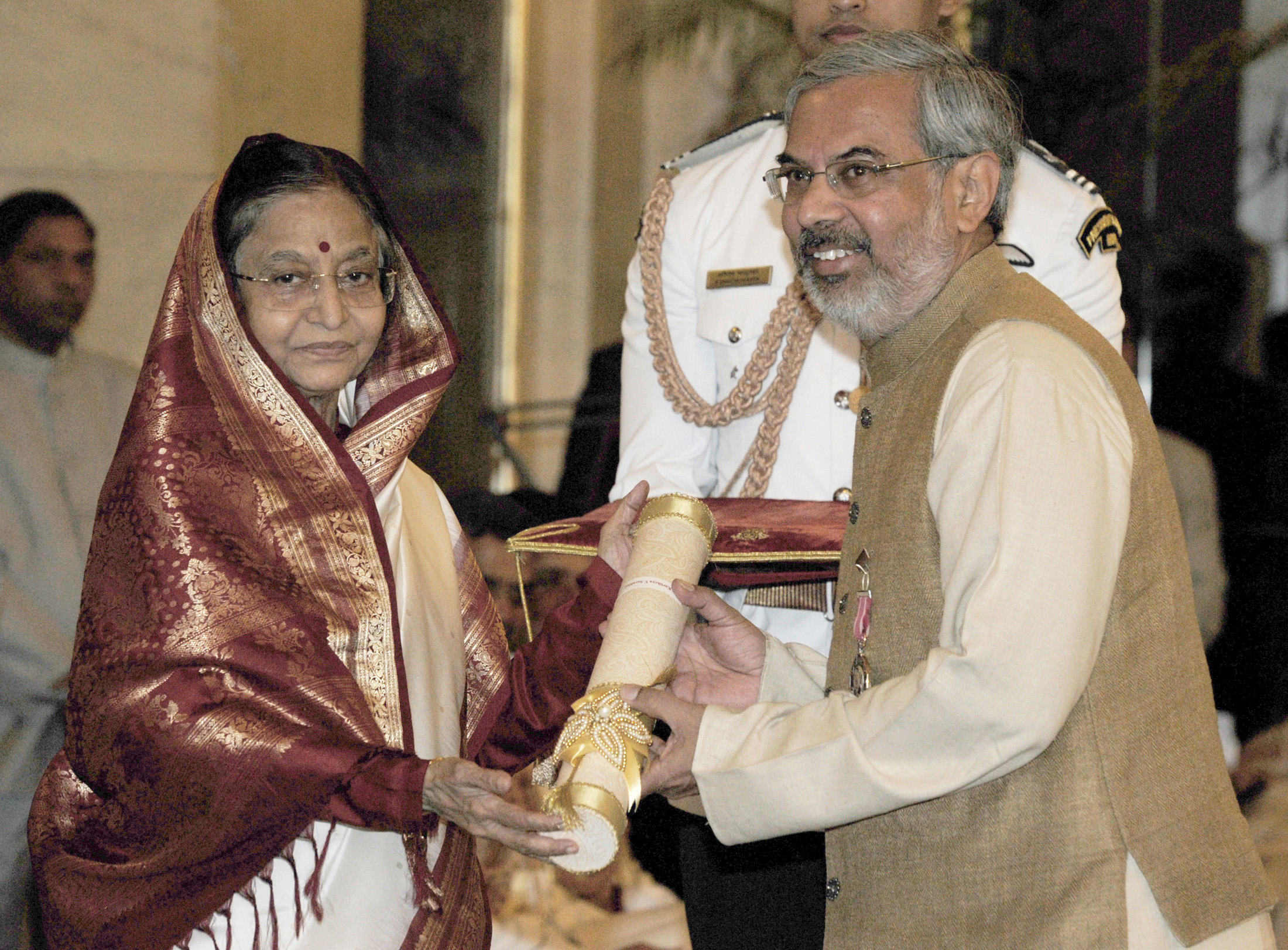
The President, Pratibha Patil presenting the Padma Shri Award to Kartikeya Sarabhai, at an Investiture Ceremony-II, at Rashtrapati Bhavan, in New Delhi on April 04, 2012

Kartikeya Sarabhai received the Tree of Learning Award (1998) from the IUCN in appreciation of his contributions to the field of environmental education and communication. The Indian Institute of Human Rights has presented him with the World Human Rights Promotion Award (2005). In 2012 he was conferred the Padma Shri award for his work in Environmental Education by the President of India. In 2013, he was given the Olive Green Crusader award by IAA (International Advertising Association) for his contribution in the field of environmental education and education for sustainable development. The Science Aur Kainat Society of India honored Sarabhai with the Sir C.V. Raman Memorial Award in the field of science and technology popularization and innovation in May 2014. Recipient of 2016 International Brandwein Medal by Brandwein Institute and the IUCN-CEC in recognition of his lifetime work for inspiring new generations, to experience, embrace and love nature first hand. Appointed as the International Wetskill Ambassador by Wetskills Foundation, Netherlands during the Finals of Wetskills-India 2017 at Vibrant Gujarat Global Summit 2017. He has also received the prestigious Gujarat Ratna Sanman in 2023.

== Author and Editor ==
Sarabhai is the editor-in-chief of the Journal on Education for Sustainable Development (JESD). He has recently written a book 'Observing Nature in an Urban Forest' A publication in which Kartikeya V. Sarabhai shared his observations and photographs of nature and the birdlife in the urban estate created by his grandfather Ambalal Sarabhai more than a hundred years ago.
