= Gita Sarabhai =

Indian musician and patron (1922–2011)

Geeta Sarabhai Mayor
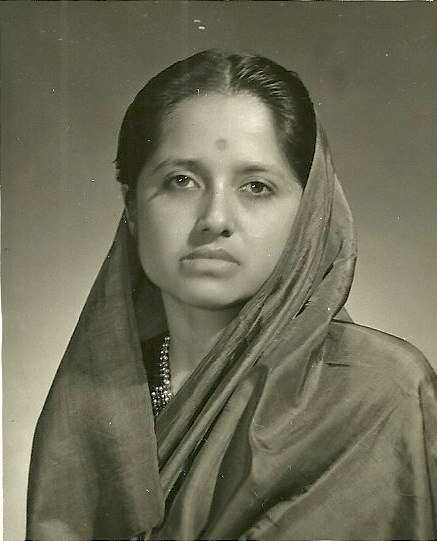
- Geeta Sarabhai Mayor, Ahmedabad, 1952
- Born: 1922; Ahmedabad, British India
- Died: 11 March 2011 (aged 88-89); Ahmedabad, Gujarat, India
- Education: Bhatkhande Music Institute Deemed University earlier known as Marris School of Music
- Occupation: Musician
- Known for: Music composition
- Spouse: Satya Dev Mayor
- Children: Pallavi Satyadev Mayor
- Relatives: Ajay Mayor (Grandson)
- Family: Sarabhai family
- Musical career
- Genres: Hindustani Classical
- Instrument: Pakhawaj

Geeta Sarabhai Mayor (née Sarabhai; 1922 – 11 March 2011) was an Indian musician, well known for her patronage in music. She was among the first women to play the pakhavaj, a traditional barrel-shaped, two-headed drum. She promoted exchanges between Indian and Western music, particularly for bringing Ahmedabad to New York City. During a study stay in New York, she taught Indian music and philosophy to the experimental composer John Cage, in exchange for a course on the theory of Western music. The course included the twelve-tone technique of Arnold Schoenberg. In 1949, Geeta Sarabhai founded the Sangeet Kendra in Ahmedabad, whose mission is to document and promote classical and popular Indian musical traditions. Gita was a part-time faculty of music at National Institute of Design, Ahmedabad.

== Life and career ==
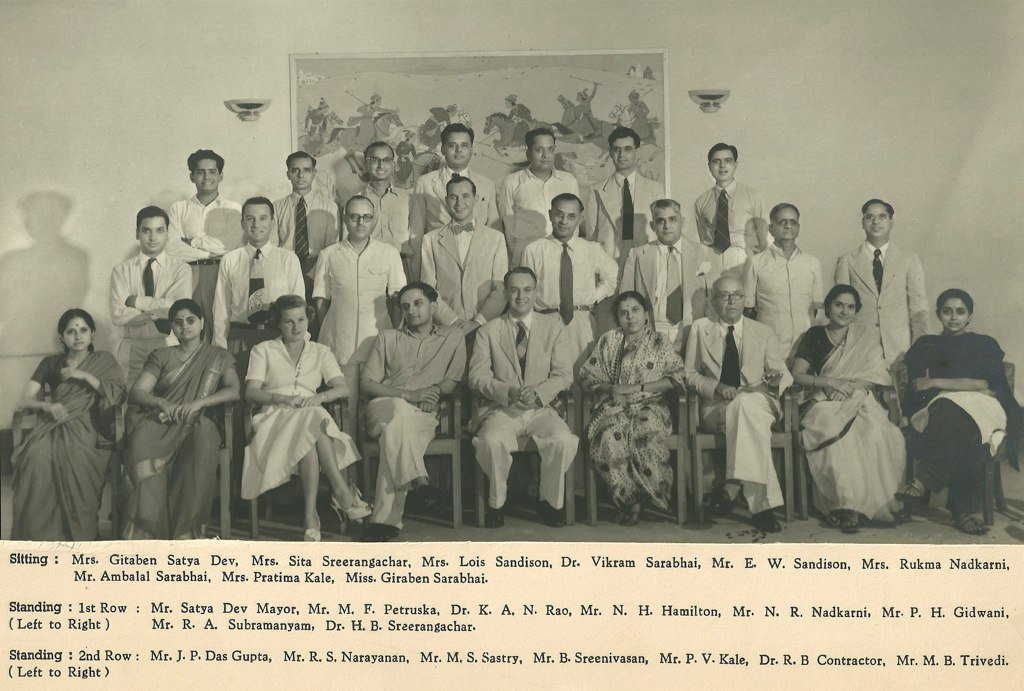
Geeta Mayor, sitting, extreme left, along with her father Ambalal Sarabhai 3rd seat from the right, sister Gira Sarabhai sitting on the extreme right and,, their brother Vikram Sarabhai, seated, 4th from the left.

Geeta Sarabhai is the daughter of Gujarati industrialist Ambalal Sarabhai (1890–1967), who played a key role in the struggle for Indian independence. Ambalal Sarabhai supported Mahatma Gandhi as early as 1916, notably by providing him with financial aid, and it was at Ahmedabad where Mahatma Gandhi established his first Ashram.

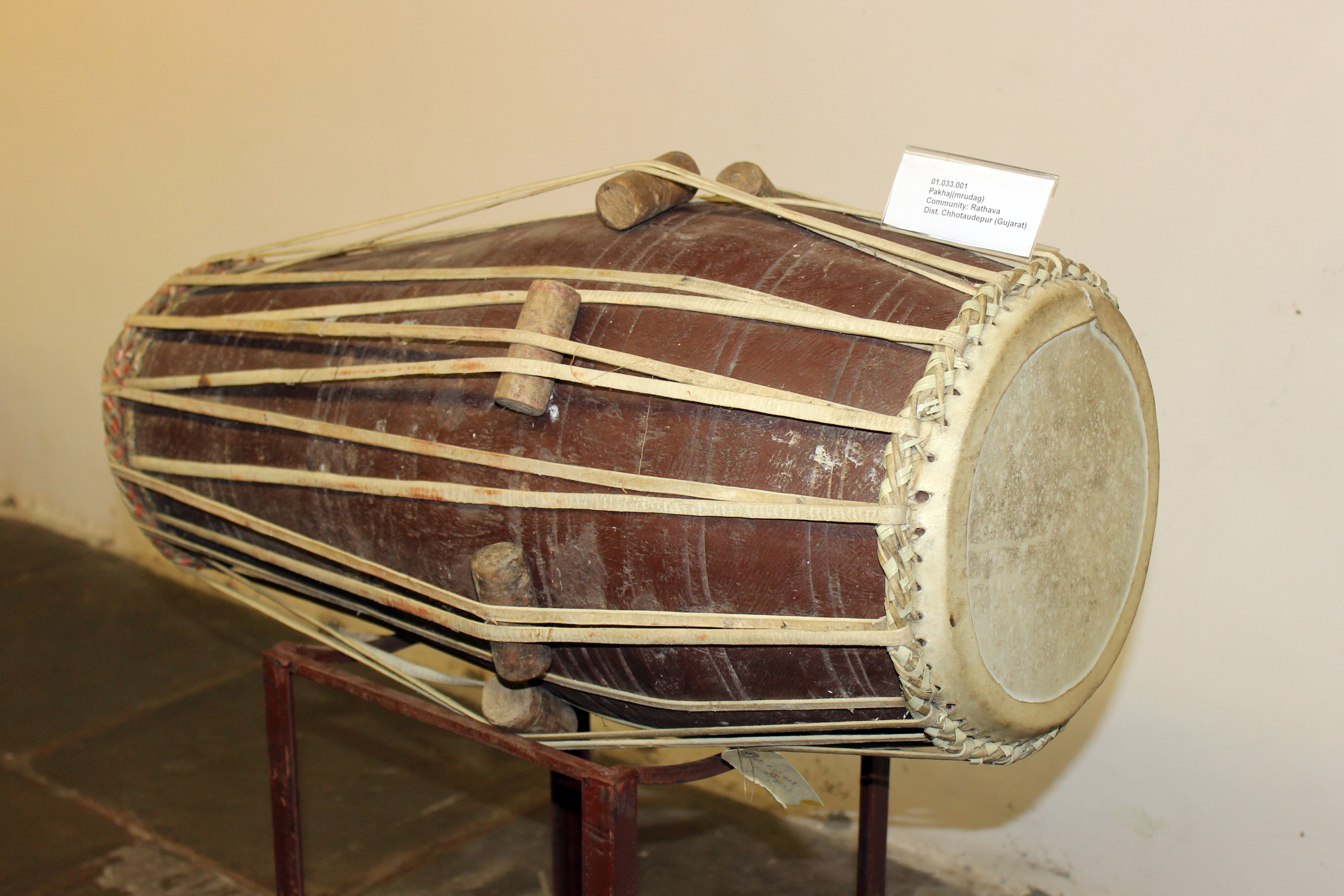
Pakhavaj, a traditional barrel-shaped, two-headed drum

For eight years, Geeta Sarabhai trained in vocals, percussion and music theory of Hindustani classical music. She learned to play the pakhavaj with masters Govindrao Burhanpurkar, Kumari Chitrangana, Kumari Poorva Naresh and Rasoolan Bai. However, she was concerned about the overwhelming ascendancy exercised by Western music over the traditional music of her country. She decided to better understand the Western musical tradition to understand its influence.

Her sister Gira Sarabhai trained and worked with Frank Lloyd Wright at Taliesin Fellowship, where she assisted with the design for the spiral-shaped Guggenheim Museum. Gita was a musician with a fine knowledge of India's traditional music which she worked to preserve. Among many of the initiatives the Sarabhais funded, Gita notably introduced the great pakhavaj legend, her master Govindrao Burhanpurkar, to Ahmedabad, contributing decisively to his fame. Sangeet Kendra's collection has recordings of Indian musicians like Kesarbai Kerkar, Rasoolan Bai, Dagar Brothers, Asad Ali Khan amongst others.

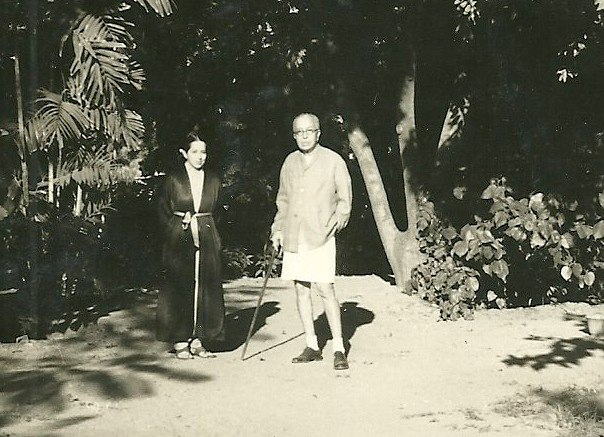
Geeta Sarabhai Mayor and her father, Ambalal Sarabhai, while out for a morning walk in the spacious grounds of their residential complex called "The Retreat", designed by Le Corbusier.

=== Geeta Sarabhai and John Cage ===
In 1946, Geeta Sarabhai went to New York to study Western music. Through Isamu Noguchi, she met the composer John Cage, then in the midst of personal slump. In Indeterminacy, Cage recounted how he met Gita Sarabhai. Sarabhai was interested in the influence of Western music on traditional Indian music. She was going to study Western music and she had contemplated the Juilliard School.

She studied contemporary music and counterpoint with me. She said, “How much do you charge?” I said, “It’ll be free if you’ll also teach me about Indian music.” We were almost every day together. At the end of six months, just before she flew away, she gave me The Gospel of Sri Ramakrishna. It took me a year to finish reading it.

This exchange influenced Cage's career and, by extension, the history of Western avant-garde music. Cage would go on to write Sonatas and Interludes. Sarabhai and Cage formed a close friendship – Cage wanted to eliminate personal expression in music and Sarabhai had learned from her Indian master that music is not a conscious activity, but is given to someone fit to receive it.

Following this, Cage and his companion, choreographer Merce Cunningham, maintained a strong bond with Geeta Sarabhai. Thus the Cunningham Dance Company was invited to perform in Ahmedabad during its world tour in 1964. Cage and David Tudor were also a part of the program with Merce Cunningham. Tapes are extant that show that Sarabhai was one of the first Indian women to have composed on the Moog synthesizer, under the tutelage of Tudor in 1969.

== See also ==
- Sarabhai family
- Darpana Academy of Performing Arts
- John Cage
- Isamu Noguchi
