= Anasuya Sarabhai =

Indian labour activist (1885–1972)

- Born: 11 November 1885; Ahmedabad
- Died: 1 November 1972 (aged 86)
- Education: London School of Economics
- Relatives: Sarabhai family

Anasuya or Anusyabehn Sarabhai (11 November 1885 – 1 November 1972) was a pioneer of the women's labour movement in India. She founded the Ahmedabad Textile Labour Association (Majdoor Mahajan Sangh), India's oldest union of textile workers, in 1920 and Kanyagruha, in 1927 to educate girls of the mills. Also she was a beloved friend of Mahatma Gandhi who considered her "Pujya" ("Revered"), during his initial struggle of the Indian Independence Movement and as well as helping him establish his ashram at Sabarmati.

== Early life and education ==
Sarabhai was born in Ahmedabad on 11 November 1885 into the Sarabhai family, a family of industrialists and business people. Both her parents died when she was nine, so she, her brother Ambalal Sarabhai, and a younger sister were sent to live with an uncle. She undertook an unsuccessful child marriage at the age of 13. The marriage was later annulled. With the help of her brother, she went to England in 1912 to take a medical degree, but switched to the London School of Economics when she realised the animal dissection involved in obtaining a medical degree was in violation of her Jain beliefs. Whilst in England, she was influenced by the Fabian Society, and got involved in the Suffragette movement.

== Political career ==
Sarabhai returned to India in 1913 and started working for betterment of women and the poor, particularly among mill workers. She also started a school. She decided to get involved in the labour movement after witnessing exhausted female mill workers returning home after a 36-hour shift. She helped organise textile workers in a 1914 strike in Ahmedabad. She was also involved in a month-long strike in 1918, where weavers were asking for a 50 per cent increase in wages and were being offered 20 per cent. Mahatma Gandhi, a friend of the family, was by then acting as a mentor to Sarabhai. Gandhi began a hunger strike on the workers' behalf, and the workers eventually obtained a 35 per cent increase. During the time, Sarabhai organized daily mass meetings of the workers that Gandhi addressed. Following this, in 1917, the Ahmedabad Textile Labour Association (Majdoor Mahajan Sangh) was formed and Anasuya was made its lifelong president by Gandhi.

Sarabhai organized assorted craft unions early in her career and by 1920 was instrumental in establishing the conglomerate Textile Labour Association. Throughout her life, Sarabhai assisted with negotiations and dispute resolution for the labourers that she worked with.

== Legacy and death ==
Sarabhai was called Motaben, Gujarati for "elder sister". She mentored Ela Bhatt, founder of the Self-Employed Women's Association of India (SEWA). Sarabhai died on 1 November 1972.

On 11 November 2017, Google celebrated Sarabhai's 132nd birthday with a Google Doodle, visible to users in India.

Anasuya Sarabhai was the aunt of Indian scientist Vikram Sarabhai who is regarded as the father of the Indian space program.

== See also ==
- Sarabhai family
- List of Jains
