= Impacts of tourism in Kodagu district =

Tourism has been an ever-growing industry in the Kodagu district of India. The impacts of tourism in Kodagu district effect the country's economy, environment, and culture. The impacts can be positive and negative. Ecotourism and homestays have been adopted to provide stable household income, and promote environmental awareness and cultural experiences to foreign travellers. Economic impacts include overall income increasing from employment but jobs were usually seasonal. Environmental impacts like funding from tourism would support conservation efforts and natural resource management but would bring pollution and biodiversity degradation to the district. Sociocultural impacts where residents of Kodagu like having tourists but risk losing access to resources. Kodagu district is commonly known as the "Scotland of India". The district is a hotspot for tourism and recreational activities. The mountainous Kodagu region is filled with biologically diverse tourist attractions such as waterfalls, forests, and wildlife which can be impacted by tourism.

== Economic impacts ==
=== Positive economic impacts ===
Tourism emerged as another service for economic growth alongside agriculture. It has generated employment opportunities. Job scarcities are apparent since some locals in Kodagu do not have the means to receive an education but tourism can allow for locals from any economic background to gain an income. Tourism and tourism-related businesses are primary sources of income for some Kodagu residents. Homestays provide a source of income for host families since it does not require a lot of investment. The ecotourism industry has opened many income opportunities. Tourism has allowed for the generation of foreign exchange earnings. Tourists are giving small businesses by buying local souvenirs and crafts.

=== Negative economic impact ===
60-70% of local businesses provide employ non-local people while also purchasing goods and products from non-local farms and shops. Tourism income from resorts and lodges are invested in non-local people and companies. Increased tourism impacts the price of basic necessities and services which affect the local economy. Tourism employment and income is seasonal. Homestays must be registered under the Coorg Home Stays Association (CHSA) to be legal. Undocumented homestays are then charging cheaper rates to tourists and competing with registered homestays, thus reducing the amount of tourists in legal homestays.

== Environmental impacts ==
=== Positive environmental impacts ===
Tourism brings financial support to the conservation of their natural resources. Both ecotourism and homestays can help promote conservation awareness among tourists, authorities, and local communities. Activities that include the natural environment are enjoyed by tourists. Karnataka tourism has been promoting the concept of jungle lodges and resorts since it has been effective in protecting biodiversity. It allows tourists to interact with nature in the district and educates them on the need of maintaining the environment.

The Centre for Environment Education (CEE) developed an Ecofriendly Reuse and Recycling Unit (ERU) located in Kodagu which promotes the production of various products made from discarded paper and plastic from commercial sectors.

=== Negative environmental impacts ===
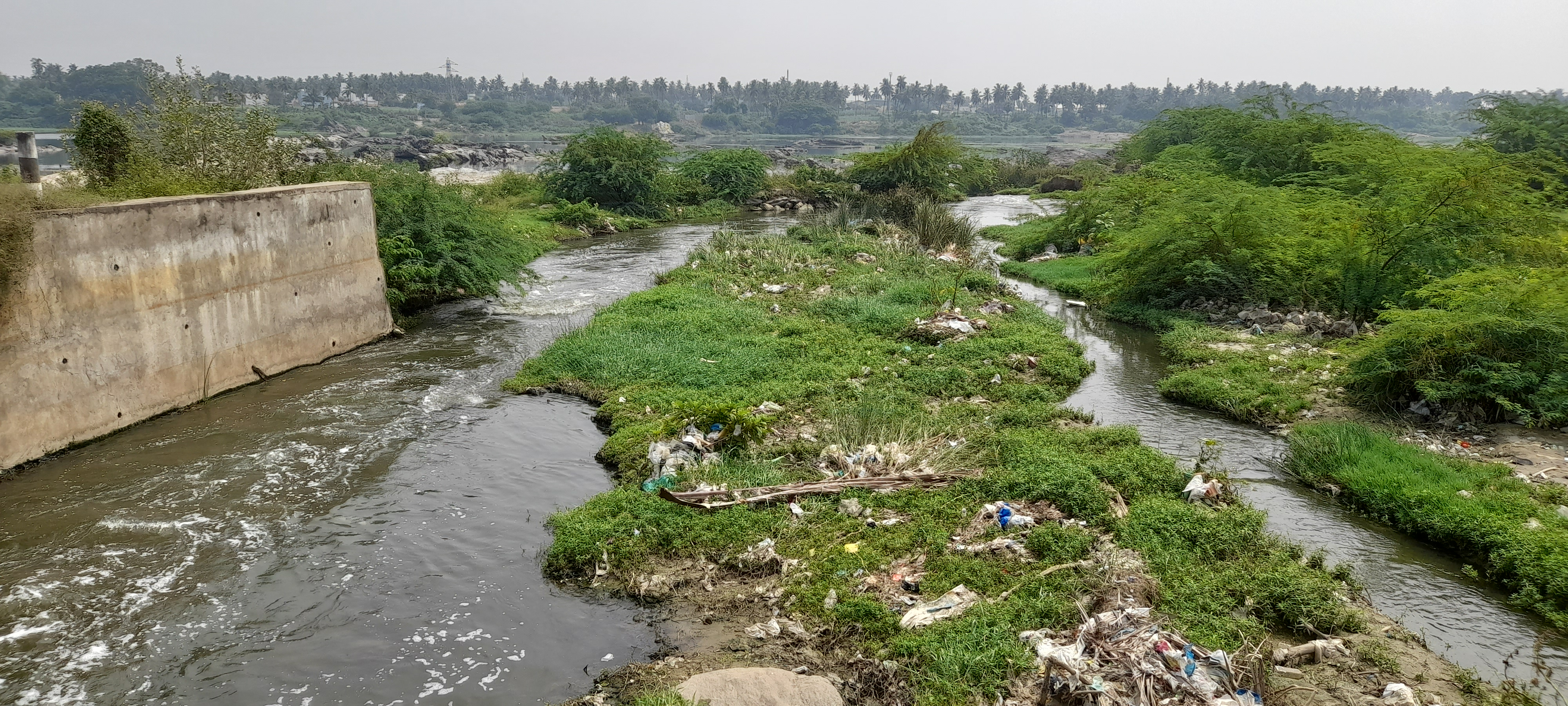
Pollution of solid waste in Kaveri River.

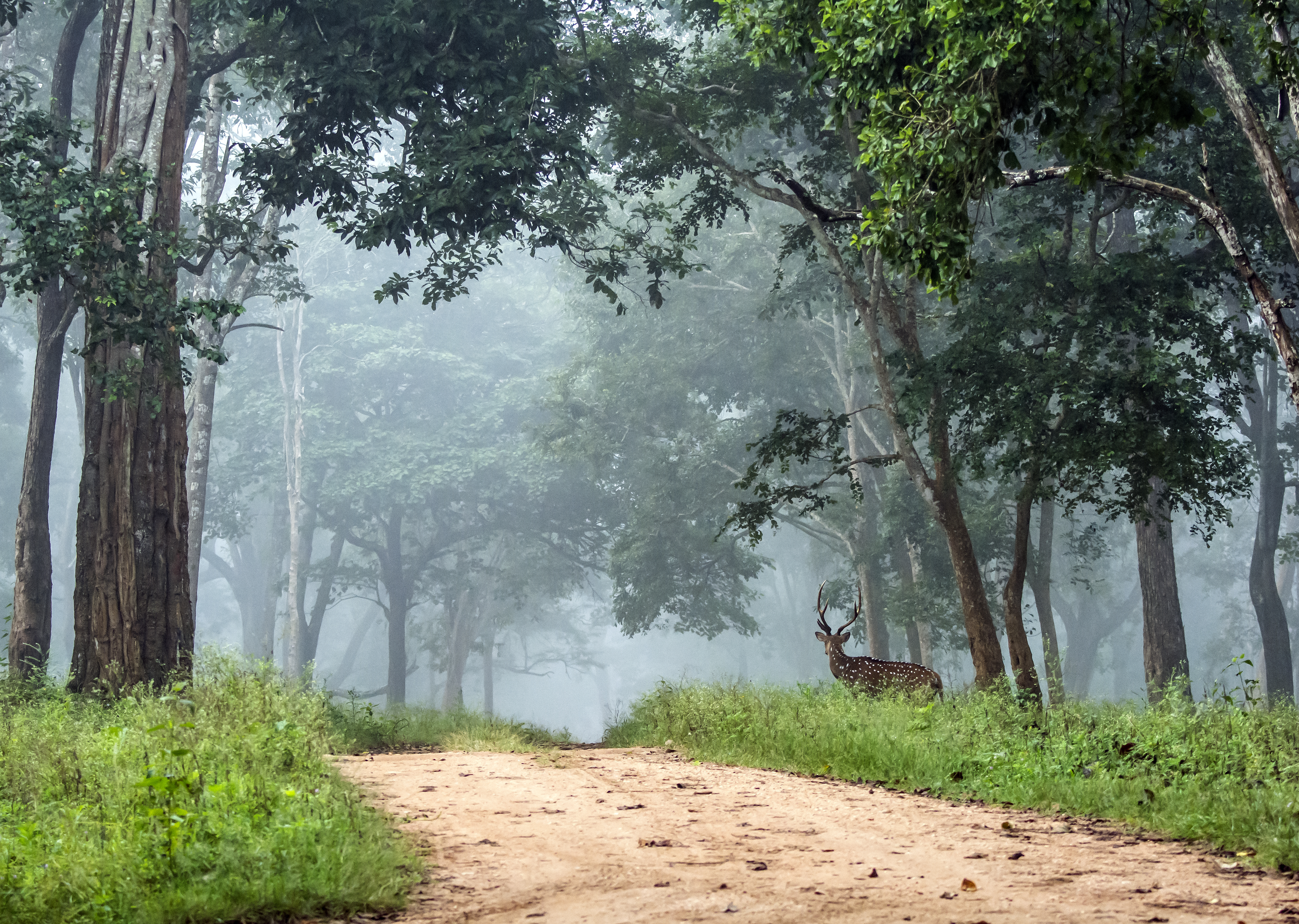
Nagarhole National Park

Increased tourist development and traffic impact the natural environment. Biodiversity in national parks face impacts from tourism. There is a reduction of forest cover from tourism infrastructure. Emissions from deforestation and the loss of carbon sinks contribute to climate change. Adverse environmental impacts of tourism include: pollution, soil erosion, degradation of biodiversity, and over-exploitation of natural resources. Embankments and waste bins in touristic sites are overflowing with waste such as plastics and aluminum cans. Water pollution can also be caused by tourism through the disposal of plastic waste and coins in bodies of water. Contamination of water, air, and soil is correlated to the subsequent decrease in local health within the Kodagu District. Due to the lack of planning, infrastructure, and lack of awareness, locals and tourists end up disposing of waste improperly, not only by dumping into water resources but also by burning them which could cause air pollution correlated to many other health risks. Tourism activities contaminate the water quality and aquatic biodiversity in the Kaveri River.

== Socio-cultural impacts ==
=== Positive socio-cultural impacts ===
Data collected through a questionnaire method showed that Kodagu residents like tourism. Tourists are adopting homestay vacations as a result of efforts to preserve cultural heritage sites. Homestay tourism allows for educational opportunities through the exchange of experiences, cultures, and traditions with guests from all over the world. In interviews, local respondents state that homestay tourism helps preserve their culture and allows for tourists to live with the locals rather than stay in modern hotels. This type of tourism promotes collective participation in local communities. For example, traditional dances are organized by Kodagu club members to build community pride and display social values.

=== Negative socio-cultural impacts ===
Tourists that come into the district may not be educated and do not show respect to the traditions and customs. Tourist behaviors can be seen as inappropriate. Lack of awareness can have negative impacts on the culture. Local traditional values and culture can diminish or change from imitating the behaviors of frequent tourists. Local residents in Kodagu agreed that they suffer from living in a tourist area. Tourism impacts working class locals access to affordable food, housing, and medication. It also impacts local small-scale businesses.
