= Journal of Education for Sustainable Development =

- Discipline: Education & Development Studies
- Language: English
- Edited by: Prithi Nambiar

Publication details
- History: Mar 2007
- Publisher: Sage Publications India Pvt Ltd
- Frequency: Bi-annually

Standard abbreviations
- ISO 4: J. Educ. Sustain. Dev.

Indexing
- ISSN: 0973-4082 (print); 0973-4074 (web)

Links
- Journal homepage; Online access; Online archive

The Journal of Education for Sustainable Development is a forum for discussion and dialogues in the emerging field of Education for Sustainable Development (ESD). The journal is published by Sage Publications India Pvt Ltd, India in association with the Centre for Environment Education.

The journal is a member of the Committee on Publication Ethics (COPE)..It is edited by Prithi Nambiar.

== Abstracting and indexing ==
Journal of Education for Sustainable Development is abstracted and indexed in:

- ProQuest: International Bibliography of the Social Sciences (IBSS)
- ProQuest Science Journals
- DeepDyve
- Portico
- Dutch-KB
- EBSCO
- OCLC
- ICI
- Sustainable Development
- Illustrata: Natural Science
- Illustrata: Technology Collection
- ProQuest Engineering
- ProQuest Green Technology
- ProQuest Environmental Sciences
- ProQuest Sustainability Science
- Illustrata: Technology
- ProQuest Education
- ProQuest Earth Sciences
- J-Gate
- UGC-CARE (GROUP I)
- CABELLS Journalytics
