= Mallika Sarabhai =

Indian politician

Padma Bhushan Mallika Sarabhai
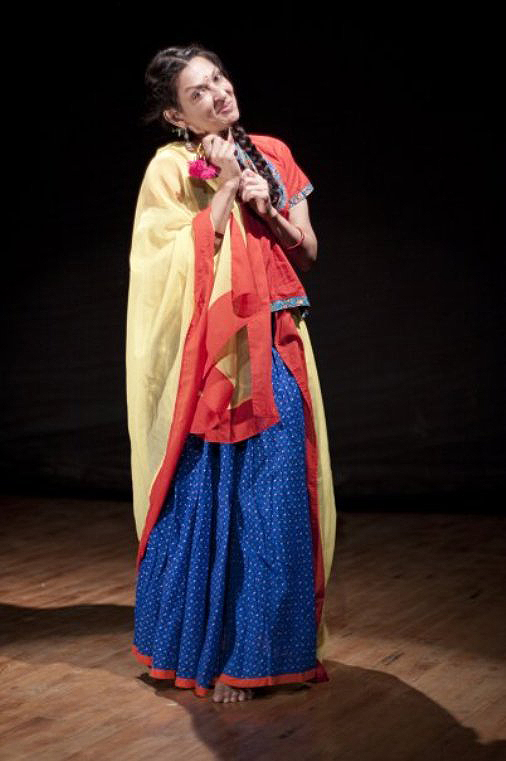
- Sarabhai in Bertolt Brecht's adaptation of The Good Person of Szechwan directed by Arvind Gaur
- Born: 9 May 1953 (age 73); Ahmedabad, Gujarat, India
- Occupations: Kuchipudi and Bharatanatyam dancer, actress, politician
- Years active: 1969–present
- Political party: Aam Aadmi Party (2014–present)
- Other political affiliations: Independent (2009–2014)
- Spouse: Bipin Shah
- Children: 2, including Revanta
- Parents: Vikram Sarabhai; Mrinalini Sarabhai
- Relatives: Kartikeya Sarabhai (brother); Subhashini Ali (cousin); Shaad Ali (nephew)
- Awards: Padma Bhushan-2010
- Website: www.mallikasarabhai.com

Mallika Sarabhai is an Indian classical dancer, activist, politician and actress from Gujarat. Daughter of a classical dancer Mrinalini Sarabhai and space scientist Vikram Sarabhai, Mallika is an accomplished Kuchipudi and Bharatanatyam dancer and performer who specializes in using the arts for social change and transformation.

== Early life and education ==
Mallika Sarabhai was born in Ahmedabad to Vikram Sarabhai and Mrinalini Sarabhai. She graduated from the St. Xavier's College, Ahmedabad with a degree in Economics. She then completed her MBA at IIM Ahmedabad in 1974 and doctorate in Organizational Behaviour from the Gujarat University in 1976. She is a noted choreographer and dancer who has also acted in several Hindi, Malayalam, Gujarati and international films.

== Career ==
Sarabhai started to learn dancing when she was young and started her film career in the parallel cinema when she was 15. Mallika played the role of Draupadi in the Peter Brook's play The Mahabharata. She has won many accolades during her long career, the Golden Star Award is one of them, which she won for the Best Dance Soloist, Theatre De Champs Elysees, Paris 1977. As well as a dancer, Sarabhai is a social activist. She manages the Darpana Academy of Performing Arts located at Ahmedabad, a centre for the arts and for the use of arts as a language for behaviour change.

=== Films ===
She acted in a Gujarati movie titled "Mena Gurjari" released on 30 August 1975. Rajiv was her hero in that movie. Movie was based upon a Gujarati Folklore.

She acted in the Prakash Mehra's Himalay Se Ooncha opposite Sunil Dutt which was released in 1975. In 1986, she acted in the Basu Chatterji's directed movie titled Sheesha opposite Mithun Chakraborty.

In 2009, Sarabhai acted in an Indian adaptation Bertolt Brecht's of The Good Person of Szechwan (Ahmedabadki Aurat Bhali-Ramkali) directed by Arvind Gaur in 34th Vikram Sarabhai International Art Festival.

=== Television ===
Sarabhai has also used film and television for social change, especially for women's empowerment and environmental consciousness. Through Darpana Communications, she has been responsible for the production of three thousand hours of TV broadcast programming, all of which has been shown through Doordarshan, Gujarati. The programming uses the most popular genres of TV. She has anchored many shows on STAR TV and Doordarshan as well as the first NACO series on HIV, Talk Positive; the science series Turning Point; Vaividhyotsav, the culture quiz and Srishti: The Environment Quiz.

In 1989, she performed hard-hitting solo theatrical works, Shakti: The Power of Women. Her performance Sita's Daughters has toured the world and been performed over 500 times in three languages. After that, she directed and acted in numerous productions reflecting current issues and awareness among people. Amongst them is An Idea Named Meera; In Search of the Goddess and SvaKranti: The Revolution Within.

== Filmography ==
Year	Title	Role	Language	Notes
1973	Sonal		Hindi	
1975	Himalay Se Ooncha	Kanchan	Hindi	
1975	Mutthi Bhar Chawal		Hindi	
1975	Mena Gurjari		Gujarati	Debut In Gujarati
1979	Shankar Parvati		Gujarati	
1979	Pithi No Rang		Gujarati	
1979	Ashadhi Beej		Gujarati	
1979	Sonba Ane Roopba		Gujarati	
1980	Maniyaro		Gujarati	
1980	Paranya Atle Pyara Laadi		Gujarati	
1981	Naag Pancham		Gujarati	
1981	Ajwali Raat Amasni		Gujarati	
1982	Peethi Pili Ne Rang Rato		Gujarati	
1982	Maa Kali Pavawali		Gujarati	
1982	Katha		Hindi	
1984	Nana Vagar No Nathiyo		Gujarati	
1986	Sheesha		Hindi	
1986	Amma		Hindi	
1988	Kehkashaa		Hindi	
1989	Baliya Dev		Gujarati	
1989	The Mahabharata	Draupadi	English	
2001	Dany		Malayalam	
2008	Lovesongs: Yesterday, Today & Tomorrow		Hindi	

== Writing ==
Sarabhai first started writing when she produced and performed Shakti: The Power of Women. Since then she has scripted her shows, TV serials for ISROs educational TV in Madhya Pradesh, film scripts and more new contemporary lyrics for Bharatanatyam. She has been a columnist for Times of India, Vanitha, The Week, DivyaBhaskar, Hans and DNA.

Sarabhai also wrote the script for the play 'Unsuni' based on Harsh Mander's book 'Unheard Voices' to raise awareness amongst children in elite schools and colleges to the real issues facing India's marginalized. The play went around 120 schools and colleges. Arvind Gaur later directed it as a play, with the same name. Darpana Academy has launched the people awareness movement through its production Unsuni which travels all over India. In the year 2012, Sarabhai co-directed 'Women with Broken Wings,' an international production with filmmaker Yadavan Chandran and Swiss pianist Elizabeth Sombart, an ode to the millions of women who have been the victims of violence. In 2014, she recreated, with Yadavan Chandran, Kadak Badshaahi, a multimedia production on the 603-year-old history of the city of Ahmedabad. The performance ran for an unprecedented 33 full nights in Darpana's venue, Natarani.

Her recent memoir is title, In Free Fall, My Experiments With Living. She recently appeared on a podcast, The Literary City with Ramjee Chandran to talk about the memoir.

== Political career ==
On 19 March 2009, Mallika Sarabhai announced her candidature against the Bharatiya Janata Party's prime ministerial candidate L K Advani for the Gandhinagar Lok Sabha seat, as an independent candidate in the 2009 general election. She had several offers from the Congress to contest elections, the first being in 1984 from Rajiv Gandhi, but did not join any political party as she believed that all parties are corrupt. She eventually lost to L K Advani by a huge margin and forfeited her election deposit in the process.

She protested against Gujarat Chief Minister, Narendra Modi during Sadbhavna Mission in September 2011. She accused Narendra Modi of scuttling the petition filed in Supreme court by her on the 2002 Gujarat violence. She joined the Aam Aadmi Party on 8 January 2014.

== Personal life ==
Mallika met Bipin Shah in 1982 and married him. They have two children, a son, Revanta and a daughter Anahita. They divorced in 1989. Bipin and Mallika co-founded Mapin Publishing in 1984 and continue to run it together. The loss of her mother, classical dancer Mrinalini Sarabhai, in 2016, left her bereft; yoga, dance, Transcendental Meditation (TM) and Non-Violent Communication (NVC) were some of the ways that she coped.

She is the cousin of Indian politician and member of the Communist Party of India (Marxist) Subhashini Ali, daughter of her mother's sister Captain Lakshmi Sehgal (née Dr. Lakshmi Swaminathan) and Colonel Prem Sehgal. Her brother is environmental educator and director of Centre for Environment Education (CEE) Kartikeya Sarabhai.

== Honour ==
- Government of Gujarat awarded her with 'Gaurav Puraskar' for the contribution in the field of drama and dance.
- She received the Padma Bhushan by government of India.
- The French Government awarded her with a knight's rank in the Order of Academic Palms in 2005 for her contribution in the field of drama and dance.

== Gallery ==
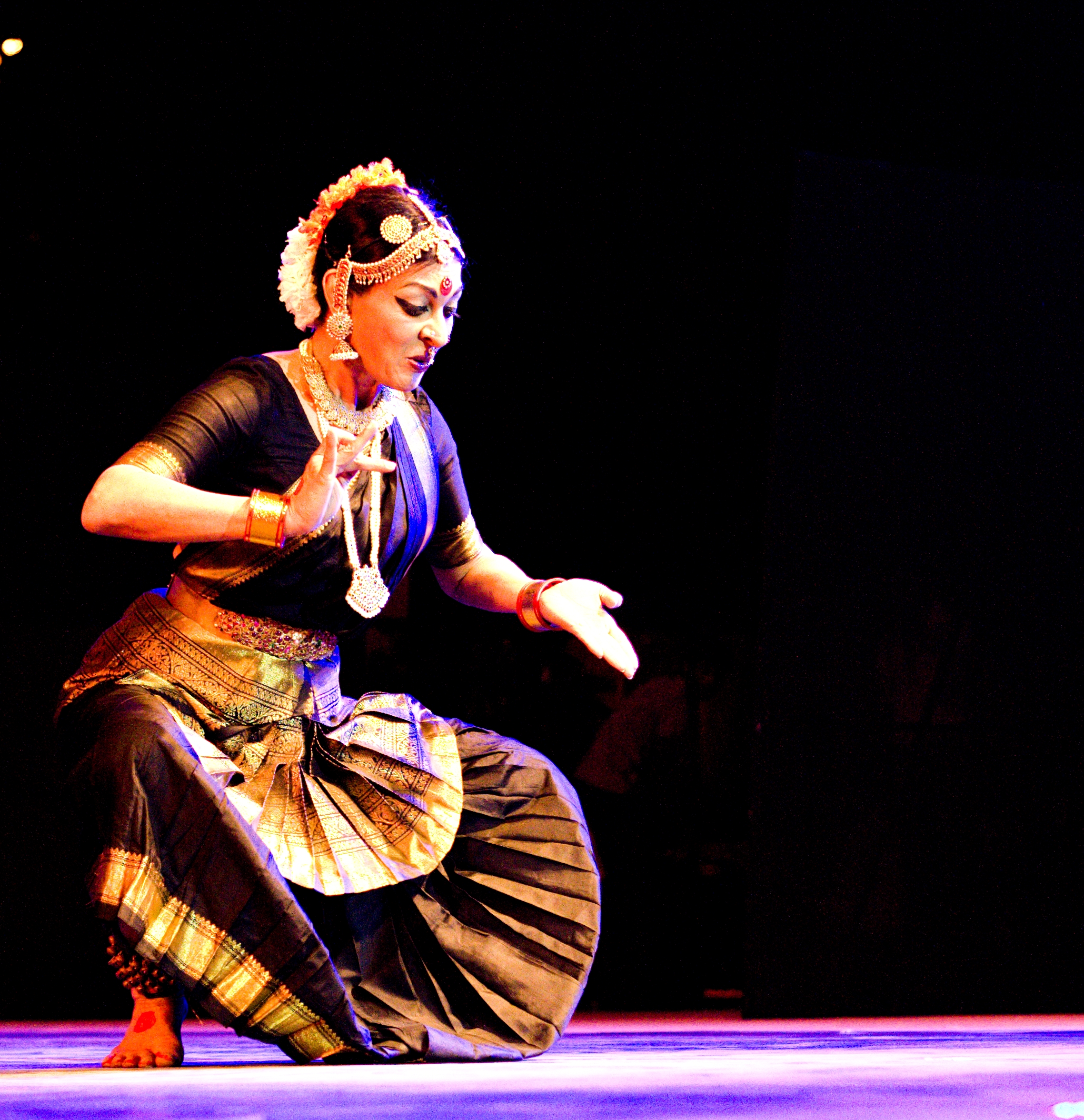
Performing Saarang in 2011, Indian Institute of Technology Madras

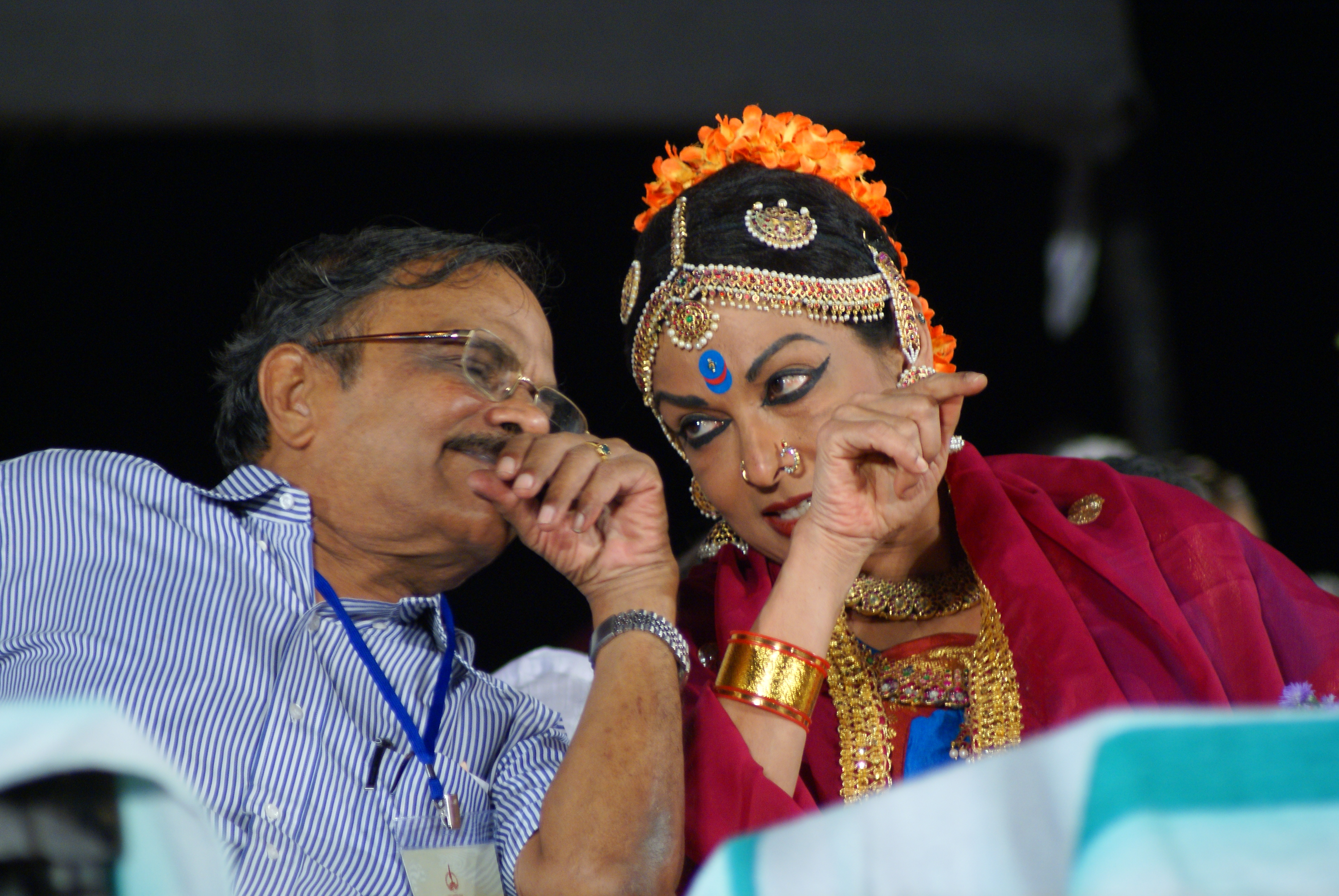
With M. T. Vasudevan Nair

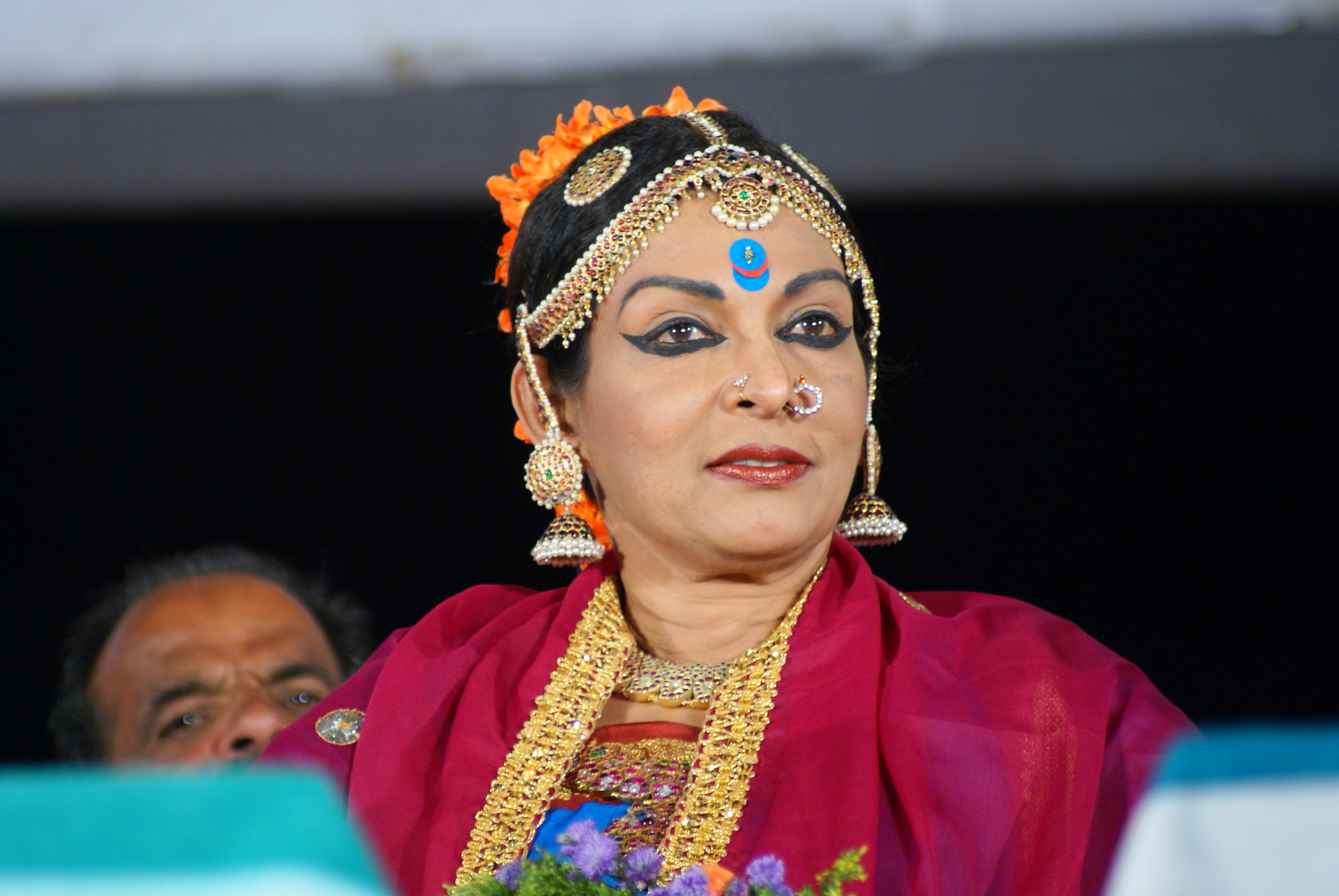

== See also ==
- Indian women in dance
- Sarabhai family
- Vikram Sarabhai
- Mrinalini Sarabhai
- Jan Lokpal Bill
