= Sheesha (1986 film) =

- Film poster
- Directed by: Basu Chatterjee
- Written by: Mani Shankar Mukherjee
- Produced by: Sattee Shourie; Mona Kapoor
- Starring: Mithun Chakraborty; Moon Moon Sen; Vijayendra Ghatge; Mallika Sarabhai
- Cinematography: K. K. Mahajan
- Music by: Bappi Lahiri
- Production company: S.G.S. Films
- Release date: 3 October 1986
- Running time: 130 minutes
- Country: India
- Language: Hindi
- Budget: ₹ 5 Crores

Sheesha (transl. Mirror) is a 1986 Indian Hindi-language drama film directed by Basu Chatterjee, starring Mithun Chakraborty, Moon Moon Sen, Vijayendra Ghatge and Mallika Sarabhai. The film was production coordinated by Mona Kapoor. The movie was based on a Bengali novel Mansamman, authored by Shankar. It was first Hindi movie about sexual harassment in office.

== Plot ==
The film is a courtroom drama as well. Dinesh Prakash (Mithun Chakraborty) and Manisha (Moon Moon Sen) are in love and they get married. Now Dinesh is the executive director at B. C. Drugs located in Chembur. At a birthday celebration on 15 December, Manisha invites their friends including Advocate Ashok Kumar (Vijayendra Ghatge). But she is shocked beyond her senses when she finds out that her husband has been arrested and charged with the rape of Poonam (Mallika Sarabhai), a telephone operator. Has Dinesh really committed any crime? Has Poonam created a trap for Dinesh? A movie ahead of its time, given the 'Me Too' syndrome. It also reflects a sad reality.

== Cast ==
- Mithun Chakraborty as Dinesh Prakash
- Moon Moon Sen as Manisha
- Vijayendra Ghatge as Advocate Ashok Kumar
- Mallika Sarabhai as Poonam
- Guddi Maruti as Rajni
- Arvind Deshpande
- Madhumita as Deepa, Wife of Adv. Kumar
- Suresh Chatwal as Damodar
- Baby Naaz as Pramila Sood
- Mrinalini as Mrs. Narayanan
- Nandita Thakur as Rukmini
- Bhagwan Sinha as Dr. H.L.Sharma
- Ravi Jhankal as Govind
- Sudha Chopra as Hairdresser
- Manek Chaudhary as Dharmaraj
- Gauri Varma as Poonam's mom
- Ranjana Sachdev as Shyama
- Sonal Randhawa as Poonam's younger sister

== Music ==
Song	Singer
"Pyar Hai Bas Yahi"	Kishore Kumar
"Pyar Hai Kya Yahi"	Kishore Kumar
"Yeh To Naari"	Bappi Lahiri
"Kya Hoga, Kyun Hoga"	Asha Bhosle
