= Ahmedabad Textile Industry's Research Association =

Indian organization

Ahmedabad Textile Industry's Research Asso
- Type: Research Institution
- Established: 1947
- Location: Ahmedabad, Gujarat, India; 23°01′56″N 72°32′27″E
- Campus: Urban, 67.21 acres (272,000 m^{2})
- Aerial: Map
- Website: https://www.atira.in

The Ahmedabad Textile Industry's Research Association (commonly known as ATIRA) is an autonomous non-profit association for textile research located in the Navarangpura area of Ahmedabad, India. It is the largest association for textile research and allied industries in India. Established on 13 December 1947, and started in 1949, ATIRA was recognized by the Council of Scientific and Industrial Research under the Ministry of Science and Technology, Government of India. It was later linked to the Ministry of Textiles.

== Establishment ==
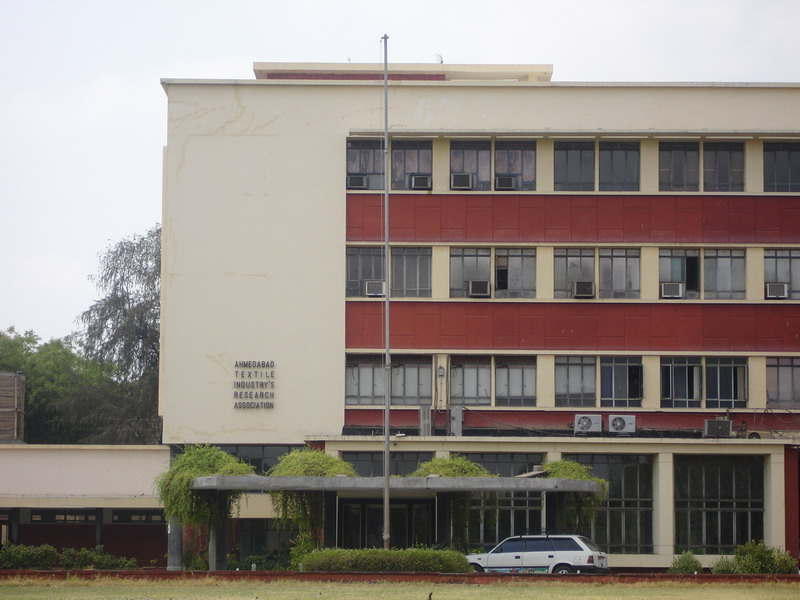
The main ATIRA building

The idea of ATIRA was conceived by Vikram Sarabhai, Kasturbhai Lalbhai and Shanti Swaroop Bhatnagar. ATIRA was founded in 1947.

Vikram Sarabhai served as its first honorary director.

== ATIRA Complex ==
The foundation stone for the ATIRA complex was laid by Vallabhbhai Patel on 1 November 1950 which was inaugurated by the then Prime Minister Jawaharlal Nehru on completion on 10 April 1954. The architect of the ATIRA building is Achyut Kanvinde.

The exterior of the building are influenced by Walter Gropius.

== Membership and funding ==
Membership in ATIRA is voluntary. ATIRA has 146 member units in both India and abroad. Of these 93 are Ginning, Spinning, Weaving, Process Houses and Composite Textile Units and 53 are manufacturers of fibres, dyes, chemicals, instruments, equipment and machinery.

ATIRA is financed by four sources – Annual Subscription from member units, income from the services it has rendered, sponsored research from the Industry, Ministry of Textiles, Ministry of Information Technology and other agencies like the Gujarat State Government. Grant aid is also provided by the Government of India.

== Administration ==
ATIRA's governing council consists of 17 members. It consists of 5 elected members from the industry, including the Chairman, 3 nominated members from various departments of Government of India and 3 scientists as designated members. In addition to these a representative from the associate members and the president of the Ahmedabad Textile Mills Association are also the members of the council. The 4 Directors of Cotton Textile Research Associations are ex-officio members including the Director of ATIRA.

At present the association has a total membership of 91 units spread all over India. This consists of 10 original or privileged members units and 81 Associate Members units.

== Location ==
ATIRA is situated close to many prominent research and educational institutions like Indian Institute of Management Ahmedabad, Physical Research Laboratory and Gujarat University. It has a 2,72,000-square-metre campus which has a plant coverage of over 1,000 trees. This has made it a popular spot for morning walks and jogging among local residents.
