= Nehru Foundation for Development =

Nehru Foundation for Development(NFD)
- Founded: 1965
- Founder: Vikram Sarabhai
- Purpose: Sustainable development, Education, Mathematics, Science, Nutrition
- Location: Ahmedabad, Gujarat, India
- Key people: Mrinalini Sarabhai

Nehru Foundation for Development (NFD) is a charitable trust dedicated to rural development and environment awareness. It was founded by Vikram Sarabhai in 1965. The foundation is dedicated to promoting basic environmental education and thinking on current problems of development at individual and the societal level.

== Concerns ==
The main objective of the foundation is to help encourage participation in the development of ideas/proposals relating to the problems of development via various methods. NFD runs a number of educational activities in fields such as Mathematics and Science. These activities are guided by the Councils of Management consisting of eminent people in the respective field from across the country.

== Affiliated Institutions ==
The various activities of the NFD are carried out by the affiliated institutions VASCSC, VIKSAT, CHETNA, CEE, and KHAMIR.

=== Vikram A Sarabhai Community Science Centre (VASCSC) ===
Vikram A Sarabhai Community Science Centre is a science center. It is located in Ahmedabad, Gujarat, India.

=== Centre for Health Education, Training and Nutrition Awareness (CHETNA) ===
==== Vikram Sarabhai Centre for Development Interaction (VIKSAT) ====
Vikram Sarabhai Centre for Development Interaction (VIKSAT) was set up in the year 1977 as an activity of the NFD to carry out environment improvement activities.

The objectives of the organization include:

- promote and strengthen People's Institutions (PIs) for natural resource management (NRM)
- evolve innovative participatory NRM strategies for dissemination and scaling up
- work towards decisive participation of the communities, especially women, and community organizations in policy forums
- strive for developing appropriate and enabling legal and policy frameworks
- facilitate technology and information access and transfer in NRM
- network with Government Organizations, Non Governmental Organisations (NGOs) and PIs and other technical institutions for the above

Over the last 35 years, VIKSAT has worked at grassroots level with communities in their local regions towards developing models which ensure sustainability of livelihoods through natural resource management. To enhance meaningful participation in natural resources management, VIKSAT has been working towards imparting skills related to management, institution building, resource generation and other support.

At present, VIKSAT has five field offices in four districts of Gujarat, namely, Bhiloda, Kheroj in Sabarkantha district; Satlasana in Mehsana district; Kukama, in Kachchh district; and Radhanpur in Patan district with the head office located in Ahmedabad, Gujarat. The primary activity areas of VIKSAT are Natural Resource Management and Sustainable Livelihoods through intensive intervention on Forestry, Land, Water, Sustainable Agriculture, Bio-diversity, Policy Advocacy and Women Empowerment.

VIKSAT's Council of Management is currently chaired by Prof. (Dr.) M.S. Swaminathan, the renowned scientist and the leader of Green Revolution in India.

The main thrust areas of VIKSAT include Natural Resource Management, Land and Water Management, sustainable livelihoods and Institutions & Capacity Building. To enhance meaningful participation in Natural Resources Management, VIKSAT has been working towards imparting community skills related to group organization, institution building, training and other resource support.

===== Achievements =====
- Participation in World Summit on Sustainable Development, 2002
- VIKSAT received a Prestigious National Award Indira Priyadarshini Vrikshamitra Puraskar in 1997 from Ministry of Environment & Forests, New Delhi. The Award is in recognition of exceptional contributions in the field of afforestation and wastelands development.
- VIKSAT Promoted Shree Janjharmata TGCS, Malekpur received a prestigious National Award Indira Priyadarshini Vrikshamitra Puraskar in 2002 from Ministry of Environment & Forests, New Delhi in the Village Level Institutions categories.
- VIKSAT Selected as a Finalist in the development marketplace global competition, 2006
- Partner, Global Water partnership, 2006
- VIKSAT promoted Shree Ashapura TGCS, Nana Kothasana got Gram Sanghthan Paritoshik 2005 from Development Support Centre, Ahmedabad.

=== Centre for Environment Education (CEE) ===
Centre for Environment Education or CEE was established in 1984 with support from Ministry of Environment and Forests (India). The primary objective of CEE is to improve public awareness and understanding of the environment with a view to promoting the conservation and sustainable use of nature and natural resources.

=== Khamir ===
Khamir is a joint initiative of the NFD, Confederation of Indian Industry and Kutch Navnirman Abhiyan which is supported by Government of Gujarat. For conservation in the areas of craft, environment and heritage in Kutch District, KHAMIR has been set up as an education, training, demonstration and Interpretation facility.

== See also ==
- Vikram Sarabhai
