= Mrinalini Sarabhai =

Indian classical dancer

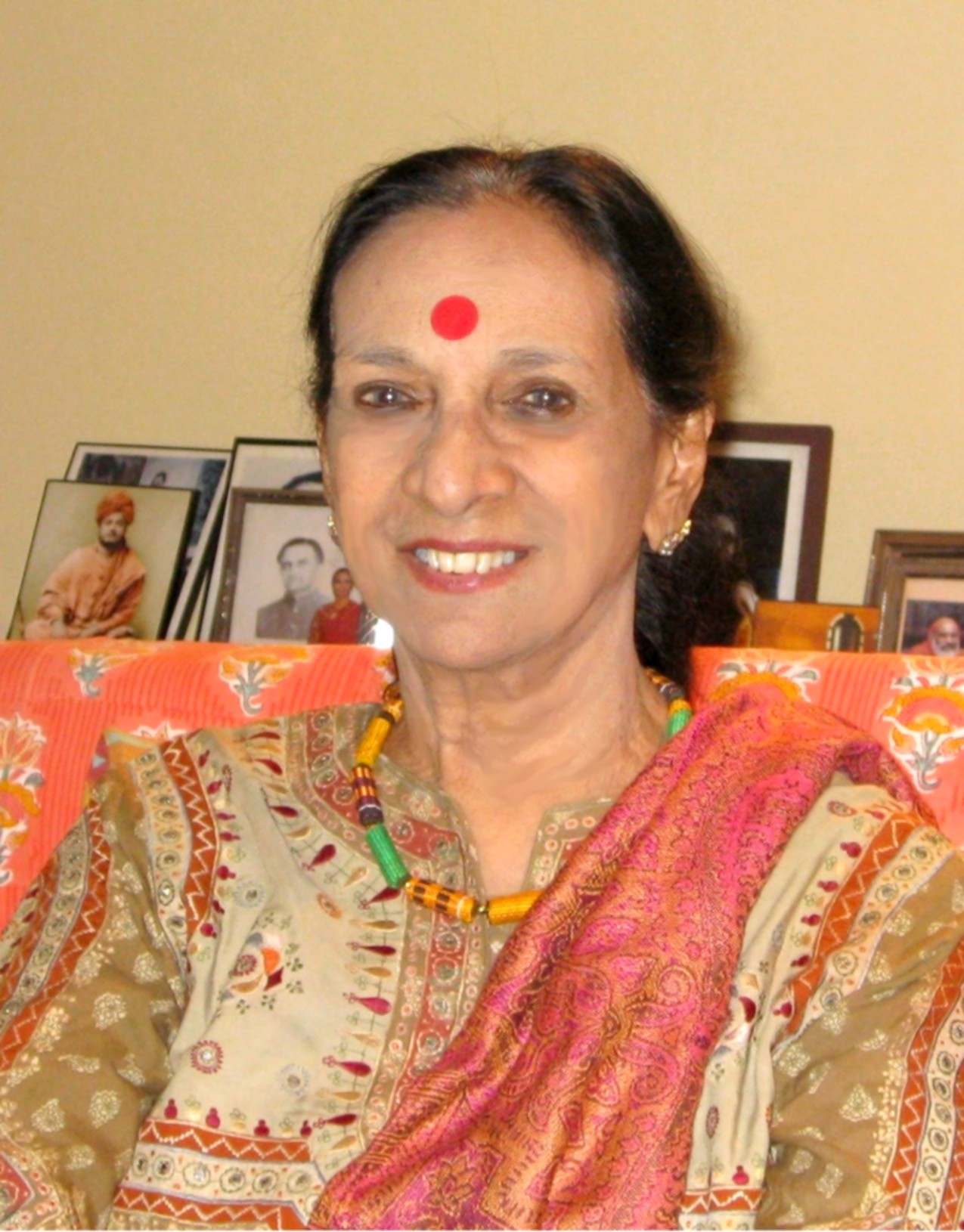
- Sarabhai in 2008
- Born: Mrinalini Swaminadhan; 11 May 1918; Madras, Madras Presidency, British India
- Died: 21 January 2016 (aged 97); Ahmedabad, Gujarat, India
- Education: Visva-Bharati University
- Occupations: Dancer, choreographer
- Title: Founder of Darpana Academy of Performing Arts
- Spouse: Vikram Sarabhai (m. 1942; died 1971)
- Children: Mallika Sarabhai (daughter); Kartikeya Sarabhai (son)
- Mother: Ammu Swaminathan
- Relatives: Lakshmi Sahgal (elder sister)
- Family: Swaminathan family Sarabhai family
- Honours: Padma Bhushan (1992); Padma Shri (1965)

Mrinalini Vikram Sarabhai (11 May 1918 – 21 January 2016) was an Indian classical dancer, choreographer and instructor. She was the founder and director of the Darpana Academy of Performing Arts, an institute for imparting training in dance, drama, music and puppetry, in the city of Ahmedabad. She received Padma Bhushan in 1992 and Padma Shri in 1965. She also received many other citations in recognition of her contribution to art.

== Biography ==
=== Early life and education ===
Mrinalini was born to a Tamil father and Malayali mother in present-day Kerala on 11 May 1918. Her father was Subbarama Swaminathan, a distinguished lawyer with degrees from Harvard and London Universities, who practised criminal law at Madras High Court and was later made Principal of the Madras Law College. Her mother was her father's Sambandham partner (and later wife) A.V. Ammukutty, better known as Ammu Swaminathan, a social worker, an independence activist, and later a parliamentarian. Her elder sister Lakshmi Sahgal was the commander-in-chief of Subhas Chandra Bose's 'Rani of Jhansi Regiment' of the Indian National Army (Azad Hind Fauj). Her elder brother, Govind Swaminadhan, was a barrister who practised in Madras as a specialist in constitutional and criminal law apart from civil law and company law; he was the attorney general for Madras State (now Tamil Nadu). She attended a boarding school in Switzerland for two years, where, she received her first lessons in the Dalcroze school, a Western technique of dance movements. She was educated at Shantiniketan under the guidance of Rabindranath Tagore where she realised her true calling. She then went for a short time to the United States where she enrolled in the American Academy of Dramatic Arts. On returning to India, she began her training in the south Indian classical dance form of Bharatanatyam under Meenakshisundaram Pillai and the classical dance-drama of Kathakali under the legendary Guru Thakazhi Kunchu Kurup.

=== Marriage and the following years ===
Mrinalini married the Indian physicist Vikram Sarabhai who is considered to be the Father of the Indian Space Program on 3 September 1942. She has a son, Kartikeya and a daughter Mallika who too went on to attain fame in dance and theatre. Mrinalini founded Darpana in Ahmedabad in 1948. A year later, she performed at the Théâtre national de Chaillot in Paris.

Mrinalini and Vikram had a troubled marriage. According to biographer Amrita Shah, Vikram Sarabhai had a void in his personal life he sought to fill by dedicating himself to applying science for social good.

=== Other areas of contribution ===
Besides choreographing more than three hundred dance dramas, she has also written many novels, poetry, plays and stories for children. She was the chairperson of the Gujarat State Handicrafts and Handloom Development Corporation Ltd. She was also one of the trustees of the Sarvodaya International Trust, an organisation for promotion of Gandhian ideals, and was also the chairperson of the Nehru Foundation for Development (NFD). Her autobiography is titled Mrinalini Sarabhai: The Voice of the Heart.

=== Death ===
She was admitted to hospital on 20 January 2016 and died the next day at the age of 97.

== Awards and recognition ==
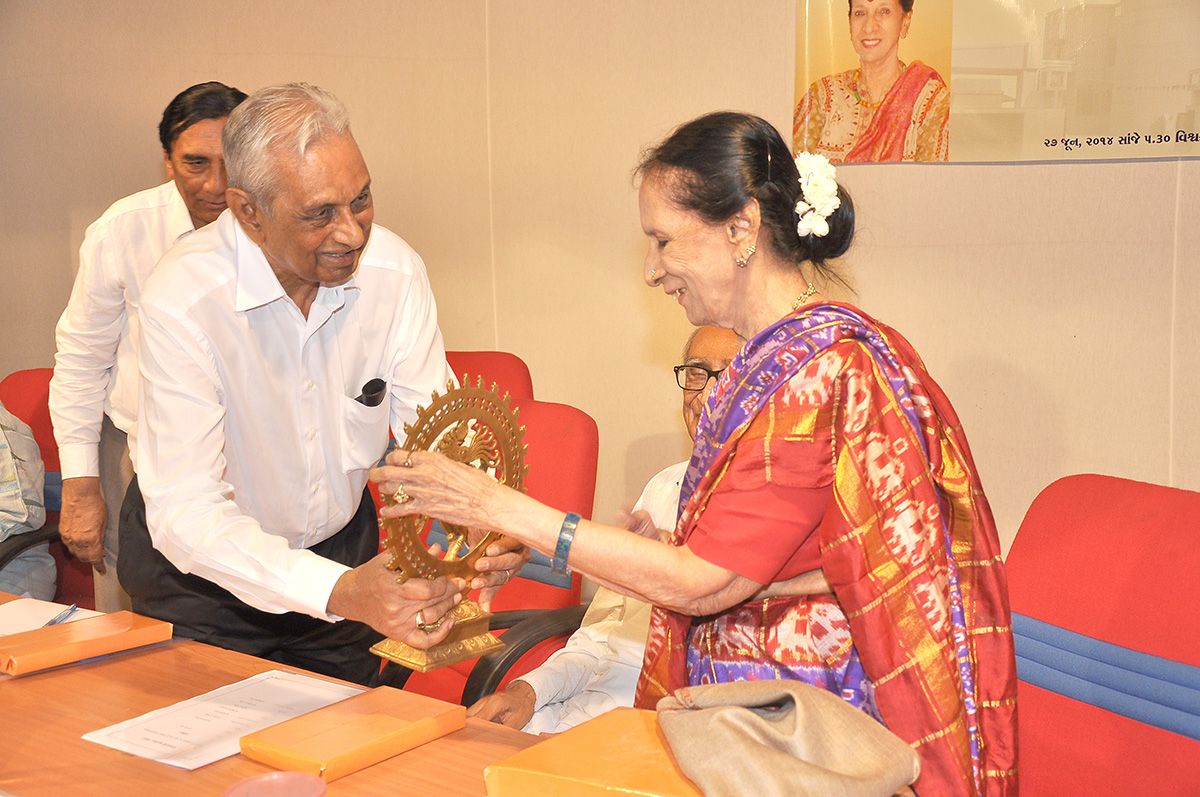
C. K. Mehta presenting the Dhirubhai Thakar Savyasachi Saraswat Award to Mrinalini Sarabhai on 27 June 2014

Mrinalini Sarabhai has been awarded by the Indian government with the national civilian awards Padma Bhushan in 1992 and the Padma Shri in 1965. She was honoured with the Degree of Doctor of Letters, honoris causa (LittD) by the University of East Anglia, Norwich, UK in 1997. She was also the first Indian to receive the medal and Diploma of the French association Archives Internationales de la Danse. She received the Kerala Sangeetha Nataka Akademi Fellowship in 1988. She was nominated to the executive committee of the International Dance Council, Paris in 1990 and awarded the Sangeet Natak Akademi Fellowship, New Delhi in 1994. She was presented with a gold medal by the Mexican Government for her choreography for the Ballet Folklorico of Mexico.

The Darpana Academy of Performing Arts celebrated its golden jubilee on 28 December 1998, with the announcement of the annual "Mrinalini Sarabhai Award for Classical Excellence", in the field of classical dance.

Mrinalini Sarabhai: The Artist and Her Art, a documentary film based on her life released in 2012. It was directed by Yadavan Chandran and produced by the Public Service Broadcasting Trust.

She was the first recipient of the Nishagandhi Puraskaram, an annual award of the Government of Kerala. The award was presented in 2013. She was awarded the Dhirubhai Thakar Savyasachi Saraswat Award in 2014.

On 11 May 2018, Google Doodle commemorated her 100th birthday.

== In popular culture ==
Regina Cassandra portrayed her in Sony LIV's series Rocket Boys based on the life of Vikram Sarabhai and Homi J. Bhabha.

== See also ==
- List of citizens of Ahmedabad awarded with national civilian honours
- Indian women in dance
