= Centre for Environment Education =

Indian environmental organisation

- Coordinates: 23°02′40″N 72°31′07″E

The Centre for Environment Education (CEE) in India was established in August 1984 as a Centre of Excellence supported by the Ministry of Environment and Forests. The organisation works towards developing programmes and materials to increase awareness about the environment and sustainable development. The head office is located in Ahmedabad. The centre has 41 offices across India including regional cells in Bangalore (South), Guwahati (North East), Lucknow (North), Ahmedabad (West) and Pune (Central); state offices in Delhi, Hyderabad, Raipur, Goa, Coimbatore; and several field offices. It has international offices in Australia and Sri Lanka.

== History ==
The Centre for Environment Education was created in recognition of the importance of environmental education in India's overall environment and development strategy. The CEE was established as a Centre of Excellence in 1984, supported by the Ministry of Environment and Forests (MoEF), Government of India. Mr. Kartikeya Sarabhai is the director of CEE.

CEE has inherited the rich multi-disciplinary resource base and varied experience of Nehru Foundation for Development, its parent organisation, which has been promoting educational efforts since 1966 in the areas of science, nature study, health, development, and environment.

At the time it began its activities, CEE was perhaps the only organization actively engaged in environmental education in the country. While carrying out programmes in different parts of the country, it was located only in Ahmedabad. Within five years of activities, it was realized that for a country as vast and diverse as India, physical presence was important for effective implementation. Based on this, the first regional office was opened for the Southern region in 1988–89. Since then it has been a conscious effort to have an office or presence in the geographical area of work.

After completing a decade of activities in 1994, it was decided to move more from environmental education to environmental action. This was an outcome of the learnings and experiences in the first ten years. CEE began more pilot, field-level and demonstration projects towards sustainable development which could be scaled-up and replicated. Within the next ten years, these projects formed a major chunk of the centre's activities.

Today, CEE works for a wide range of sectors, target groups and geographical areas. CEE sees a major opportunity in the UN Decade of Education for Sustainable Development (DESD-2005-14) to further contribute towards sustainable development. CEE is the nodal agency for the implementation of DESD activities in India under the Ministry of Human Resources Development, Government of India.

CEE's programmes in the Decade will focus on Training and Capacity Building, Internships and Youth Programmes, Consultancy Services, Knowledge Centre for ESD, and Journal on Education for Sustainable Development.

== Mandate ==
CEE's primary objective is to improve public awareness and understanding of the environment to promote the conservation and sustainable use of nature and natural resources, leading to a better environment and a better quality of life. To this end, CEE develops innovative programmes and educational material and builds capacity in the field of Education and Sustainable Development (ESD). It undertakes demonstration projects in education, communication and development that endorse attitudes, strategies and technologies which are environmentally sustainable. CEE is committed to ensuring that due recognition is given to the role of education in the promotion of sustainable development.

== International presence ==
The expanding scope and geographical coverage of the centre's projects and programmes have led to the development of an emerging institutional profile in the South Asian and Asia Pacific region.

=== CEE Australia ===
Incorporated in July 2001, CEE Australia is dedicated to raising awareness and supporting an informed approach to environment and development issues in Australia and the Asia Pacific region.

=== CEE Sri Lanka ===
Registered in September 2004, CEE Sri Lanka has the mandate to promote environmental education and communication in Sri Lanka, strengthen EE programmes and respond to local/regional needs. It will facilitate synergies and collaborations based on the learnings and experiences of EE in India and Sri Lanka.

=== CEE Bangladesh ===
BCEE, a partnership with the Bangladesh Centre for Advanced Studies, contributes to meeting the Environment Education and Communication needs in Bangladesh.
