= Vikram Sarabhai =

Indian physicist and astronomer

Dr Vikram Sarabhai
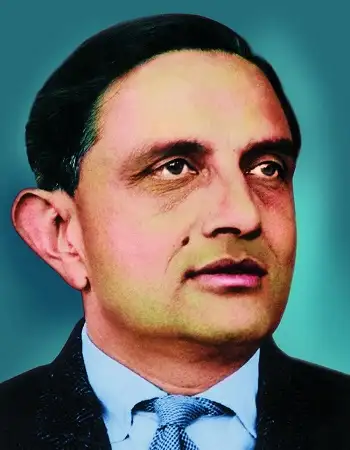
- Official portrait of Dr Vikram Sarabhai

1st Chairperson of ISRO
- In office 1969–1971
- Preceded by: Position established
- Succeeded by: M. G. K. Menon

Chairman of the Indian National Committee for Space Research
- In office 1963–1969
- Preceded by: Position established
- Succeeded by: Position abolished

Chairperson of the Atomic Energy Commission of India
- In office 1966–1971
- Preceded by: Homi J. Bhabha
- Succeeded by: H.N. Sethna

Personal details
- Born: Vikram Ambalal Sarabhai; 12 August 1919 Ahmedabad, Bombay Presidency, British India (now in Gujarat, India)
- Died: 30 December 1971 (aged 52) Halcyon Castle, Trivandrum (now Thiruvananthapuram), Kerala, India
- Spouse: Mrinalini Sarabhai (m.1942)
- Children: Mallika Sarabhai (daughter); Kartikeya Sarabhai (son)
- Parents: Ambalal Sarabhai (father)
- Scientific career
- Education: University of Cambridge (BA, PhD)
- Known for: Indian space program Indian Institute of Management Ahmedabad
- Awards: Padma Bhushan (1966); Padma Vibhushan (posthumously) (1972)
- Fields: Physics
- Workplaces: ISRO; Physical Research Laboratory
- Doctoral advisor: C. V. Raman
- Doctoral students: Udupi Ramachandra Rao

Vikram Ambalal Sarabhai (12 August 1919 – 30 December 1971) was an Indian physicist and astronomer who initiated space research and helped to develop nuclear power in India. Often regarded as the "Father of Indian space program", Sarabhai was honored with Padma Bhushan in 1966 and the Padma Vibhushan (posthumously) in 1972.

== Early life and education ==
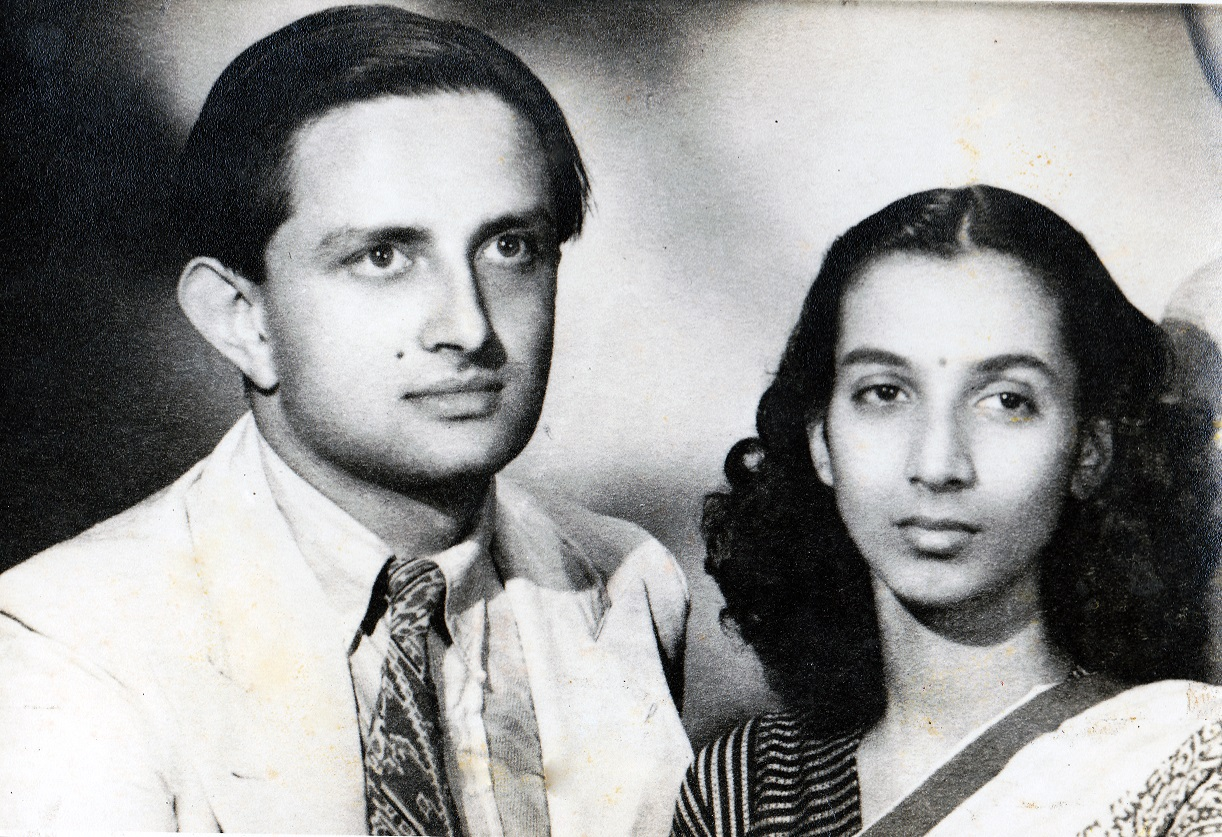
Vikram and Mrinalini Sarabhai (1948)

Vikram Sarabhai was born on 12 August 1919 in a Gujarati Śvetāmbara Shrimali Jain family, in Ahmedabad, India. His father was Ambalal Sarabhai, a major industrialist committed to the Indian independence movement.

== Professional life ==
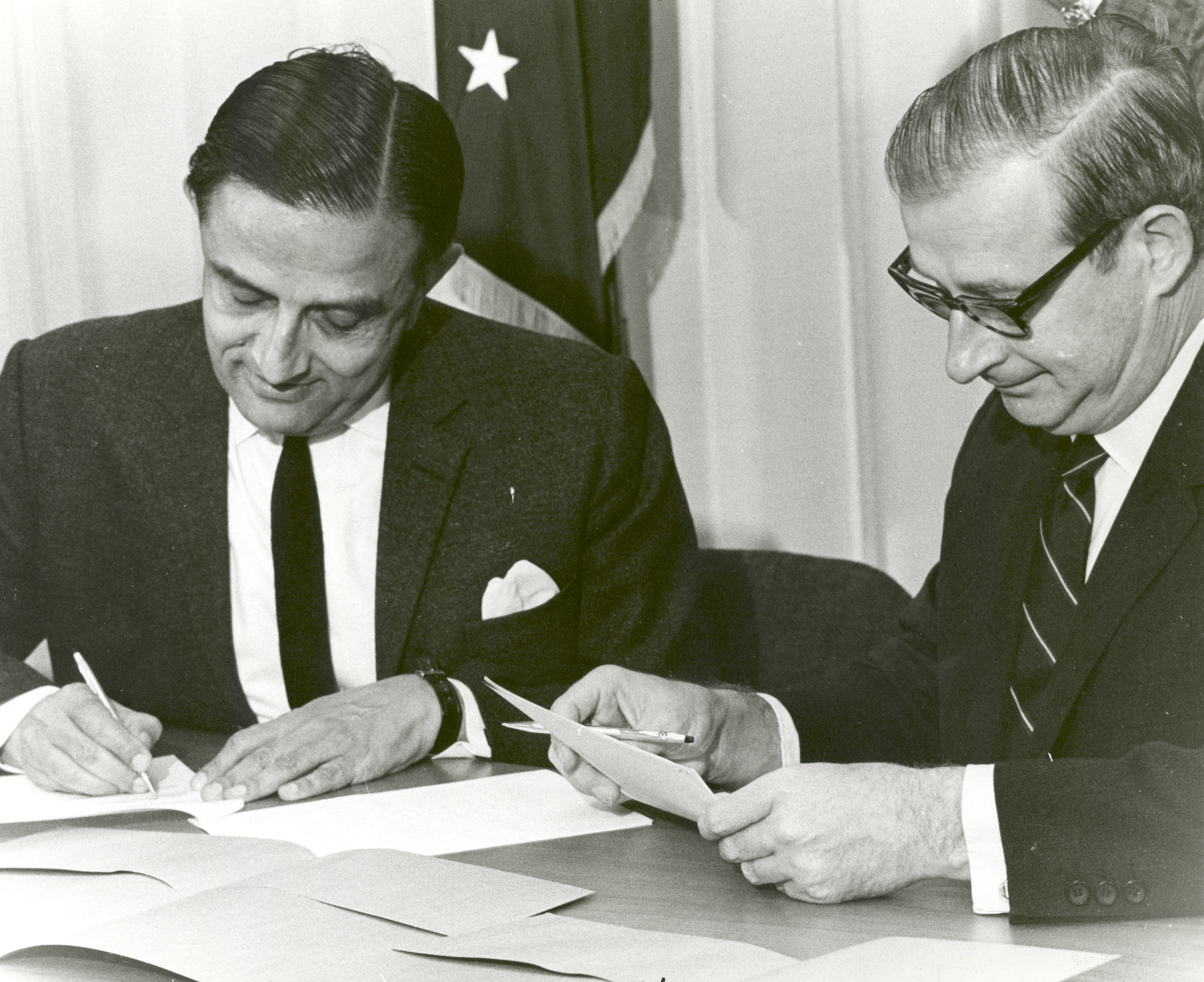
Dr. Vikram A. Sarabhai, (left) Chairman of the Indian Space Research Organization (ISRO) and head of India's Department of Atomic Energy and Dr. Thomas O. Paine, NASA Administrator, sign an agreement to cooperate in an unprecedented experiment using a space satellite to bring instructional television programs to some 5,000 Indian villages.

Known as the cradle of space sciences in India, the Physical Research Laboratory (PRL) was founded in 1947 by Vikram Sarabhai. PRL had a modest beginning at his residence, the "RETREAT", with research on cosmic rays.

The institute was formally established at the M.G. Science Institute, Ahmedabad, on 11 November 1947 with support from the Karmkshetra Educational Foundation and the Ahmedabad Education Society. Kalpathi Ramakrishna Ramanathan was the first director of the institute. The initial focus was research on cosmic rays and the properties of the upper atmosphere. Research areas were expanded to include theoretical physics and radio physics later with grants from the Atomic Energy Commission. He led the Sarabhai family-owned business conglomerate.

His interests varied from science to sports to statistics. He set up the Operations Research Group (ORG), the first market research organization in the country. Most notable among the many institutes he helped set up are the Nehru Foundation for Development in Ahmedabad, the Indian Institute of Management Ahmedabad (IIMA), and the Ahmedabad Textile Industry's Research Association (ATIRA). Along with his wife Mrinalini Sarabhai, he founded the Darpana Academy of Performing Arts. Other projects and institutions initiated or established by him include the Fast Breeder Test Reactor (FBTR) in Kalpakkam, Variable Energy Cyclotron Project in Calcutta, Electronics Corporation of India Limited (ECIL) in Hyderabad and Uranium Corporation of India Limited (UCIL) in Jaduguda, Jharkhand. Sarabhai started a project for the fabrication and launch of an Indian satellite. As a result, the first Indian satellite, Aryabhata, was put in orbit in 1975 from a Russian cosmodrome. He was the founder of Indian Space Research Organisation.

== Death ==
On 30 December 1971, Sarabhai was to review the SLV design before his departure for Mumbai the same night. He had spoken to A. P. J. Abdul Kalam on the telephone. Within an hour into the conversation, Sarabhai suffered a fatal cardiac arrest at the age of 52 in Trivandrum. His body was cremated in Ahmedabad.

== Personal life ==
Vikram Sarabhai married the classical dancer Mrinalini on 3 September 1942. The couple had two children. His daughter Mallika gained prominence as an actress and activist, and his son Kartikeya too became an active person in science. He attended Gujarat College, Ahmedabad, but later moved to the University of Cambridge, England, where he took his tripos in natural sciences in 1940. In 1945, he returned to Cambridge to pursue his PhD and wrote a thesis, "Cosmic Ray Investigations in Tropical Latitudes", in 1947.

== Distinguished positions ==
- President of the Physics section,Indian Science Congress (1962)
- President of the General Conference of the I.A.E.A., Vienna (1970)
- Chairman of the Atomic Energy Commission of India (1966–1971)
- Vice-president, Fourth UN Conference on 'Peaceful uses of Atomic Energy' (1971)
- Founder and Chairman (1963–1971), Space Applications Centre

== Legacy ==
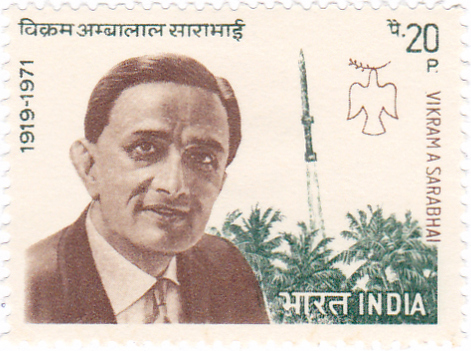
Sarabhai on a 1972 Indian stamp

- The Vikram Sarabhai Space Centre, (VSSC), which is the Indian Space Research Organization's lead facility for launch vehicle development located in Thiruvananthapuram (Trivandrum), capital of Kerala state, is named in his memory.
- Along with other Ahmedabad-based industrialists, he played a major role in setting up of the Indian Institute of Management Ahmedabad.
- Indian Postal Department released a commemorative Postal Stamp On his first death anniversary (30 December 1972)
- In 1973, the International Astronomical Union decided that a lunar crater, Bessel A, in the Sea of Serenity will be known as the Sarabhai crater.
- The lander on India's Moon mission Chandrayaan-2 which was to land near the South Pole of the Moon on Sep 20, 2019 was named Vikram in his honour.
- Vikram A Sarabhai Community Science Centre (VASCSC) located in Ahmedabad, Gujarat is named after him. Vikram Sarabhai established this institute around the 1960s.
- Former World Quiz Champion Vikram Joshi was named after him.
- A Space Museum was dedicated to him at B M Birla Science Centre, Hyderabad on 26 July 2019. The museum was curated by Pranav Sharma.
- ISRO's Vikas (rocket engine) is named after him.
- On his 100th birthday on 12 August 2019, the Indian Space Research Organization (ISRO) announced an award in the name of Vikram Sarabhai. The Vikram Sarabhai Journalism award in Space Science Technology and Research will be given to those journalists who have contributed to the fields of space science, applications, and research.

== In popular culture ==
On 12 August 2019, Google's Doodle for India commemorated Sarabhai's 100th birth anniversary. On 30 September 2020, ACK Media along with ISRO released a book namely, Vikram Sarabhai: Pioneering India's Space Programme. It was released in Amar Chitra Katha's digital platform and merchandise, ACK Comics.

A 2022 web-series Rocket Boys was based on the fictionalized lives of Sarabhai and Homi J. Bhabha, played by Ishwak Singh and Jim Sarbh respectively.

In the 2022 film Rocketry: The Nambi Effect based on Nambi Narayanan's life, Sarabhai was played by Rajit Kapur in the Hindi version and by Ravi Raghavendra in the Tamil version.

Government offices
| Preceded by Position created | ISRO Chairman; 1963–1971 | Succeeded by M. G. K. Menon |
