= Ambalal Sarabhai =

Indian industrialist (1890–1967)

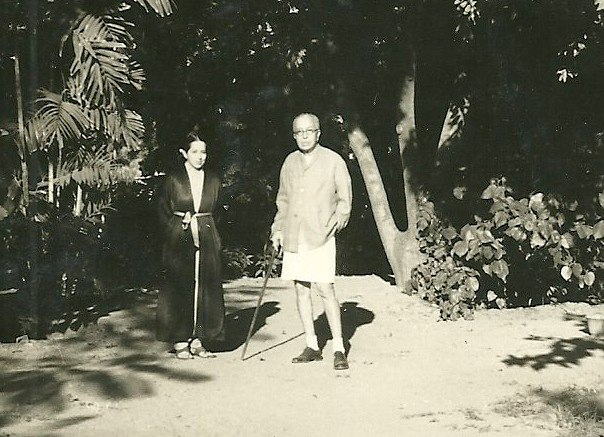
- Ambalal with his daughter, the writer, Bharti Sarabhai in 1952
- Born: 23 February 1890
- Died: 13 July 1967 (aged 77)
- Relatives: Sarabhai family

Ambalal Sarabhai (23 February 1890 – 13 July 1967) was an Indian industrialist, philanthropist, institution builder, and a supporter of Mahatma Gandhi. He was born in a Śvetāmbara Jain and Shrimali family. He served as the chairman and promoter of Calico Mills and founded the Sarabhai Group of Companies. He also was a participant in the Indian independence movement.

Ambalal was the great-grandson of Maganbhai Karamchand (1823–64), one of Ahemdabad's wealthiest Jain financiers.

After Gandhi decided to admit an untouchable family in his Kochrab Ashram, Mangaldas Girdhardas decided to stop funding to his ashram. At this time, Sarabhai stepped up to fund the Ashram and gave ₹13000 to Gandhi, which covered two years of expenses.

== Personal life ==
In 1910, Ambalal was appointed by the government to the Ahmedabad municipality at the age of twenty-one. He wed Sarladevi that same year; she was the educated daughter of a lawyer who worked in Rajkot. Ambalal set sail for England in 1912 on a ten-month voyage, with some goals of learning about the textile business and some of the country's culture. Ambalal was getting ready to turn the Ahmedabad Manufacturing and Calico Printing Company Limited, his family's business, into the biggest, most advanced textile mill in the metropolis. His spouse, their infant daughter Mridula, and several friends and relatives traveled with him.

Ambalal and his family lived the life of upper-class English aristocrats with an English butler, chauffeur, valet, and maid in a rented house in Richmond.

Ambalal Sarabhai's family earned the informal title 'Medici of Ahmedabad' for their role in the city development with their progressive views on the culture and politics of the city.

== Career ==
In 1922, Ambalal installed in the Calico Mills a complete fine- count spinning, weaving, and processing mill.

== See also ==
- Sarabhai family
