= Disability and women's health =

Article 12 of the United Nations Convention on the Elimination of All Forms of Discrimination against Women outlines women's protection from gender discrimination when receiving health services and women's entitlement to specific gender-related healthcare provisions. Article 25 of the Convention on the Rights of Persons with Disabilities specifies that "persons with disabilities have the right to the enjoyment of the highest attainable standard of health without discrimination on the basis of disability." It has been noted that the women with disabilities face obstacles and hardships and cannot access the same medical resources as those without. These obstacles are due to preconceived notions concerning their naivety, sexuality, beliefs of asexuality, and views they are not capable of competency.

While the CDC reports that 36 million women in the world have disabilities, they often do not receive the same quality of healthcare. Women with disabilities are entitled to equal access to reproductive healthcare. This article will expand on how these healthcare disparities come into fruition through issues including intersectionality, microaggression, unconscious bias, and lacks of social connectedness. The history of women and disabled women's health with be examined, as well as a focus on reproductive healthcare with areas such as maternity and contraception.

== History of women's healthcare ==
For more information on this, see Women's health.

Traditionally, men have been used to model and test health therapeutics. Most people in society grow up thinking of males as the gender centered around disabilities, which is why most research done for the betterment of disabled people is on men. Many medical professionals used believed that men and women functioned the same way physically and anatomically. Therefore, previous research used male traits to correlate to symptoms for women, when in reality symptoms are shown very differently. Physicians can also have gender bias in a diagnostic assessment of symptoms they cannot explain. Friedman reinforces that gender bias distorts objectivity, which leads clinicians to see disabled women through a lens of emotional fragility rather than taking an equal need for medical care seriously.

It wasn't until after the 1990s that women's health issues were studied in-depth in the United States. Health issues for people with disabilities began to be studied in the United States in the early 2000s. The first long-term study involving the experiences of women with disabilities and gynecological services was not published until 2001. An oversight this extensive has led to the creation of systemic barriers for disabled women in clinical care. Disabled women have reported encountering clinicians that made patronizing assumptions about their autonomy and sexuality, some even fully dismissing reproductive care concerns.

== History of disabled women's healthcare ==
Women with physical and or intellectual disabilities not only face gender bias in society, but even medical bias within their communities. Factors can include unconscious bias, symptoms, negative perceptions, and even harsh assessments that can contribute to such discrimination.

Women with disabilities, especially individuals who belong to minority groups or who live in rural settings, are often underserved in their healthcare needs. In addition, women with disabilities are more likely to live in poverty, which puts them at a greater health risk. These multiple identities that disabled women hold is easily explained through intersectionality. Intersectionality focuses on how belonging to multiple social groups can affect your way of living; and in the case of disabled women, being from also a lower socio-economic status or from a certain minority, this places them at an even greater disadvantage, making their experience more distinct than others. In general, because of a lack of social connectedness that many disabled women experience, they often become disconnected from sources of support which can include healthcare providers. In Brazil, women with disabilities are also less likely to seek out gynecological health care due to various reasons, including cultural attitudes and cost.

When disabled women need routine services for anything other than their main impairment(s), they can be perceived as "problematic patients" by healthcare providers. Women with disabilities have reported that they are seen through the lens of their disability first and as a person second by healthcare providers. They can be faced with a flow of microaggressions (actions and words that insult and put down individuals) from healthcare workers due to their disabilities. These microaggressions might come off as trivial remarks, but when used repeatedly, have been proven to have a negative impact on disabled women's overall health journey.

While many individuals think of disability as physical first and foremost, women with intellectual disabilities are treated with the most caution. They are viewed in a sense of needing to be protected and guarded rather than the usual stigma against physically disabled women to be incapable. Women with intellectual disabilities have been advised to become sterilized to possibly prevent sexual assault or because doctors may consider them unfit to become mothers. In the United States, a 1927 Supreme Court case, Buck v. Bell, allowed the forced sterilization of women with intellectual disabilities. In Singapore, the Voluntary Sterlisation Act (VSA) was passed in 1970 and which allowed any spouse, parent or guardian of persons who are "afflicted with any hereditary form of illness that is recurrent, mental illness, mental deficiency or epilepsy" to consent to the sterilization on their behalf. In Brazil, many healthcare providers and individuals with disabilities both see sterilization as the only option for contraception. These examples demonstrate the removal of self-determination from those with disabilities with the false belief of incapability.

== Accessibility of annual women's wellness visits ==
Healthcare professionals are less likely to refer women with disabilities for various gynecological screenings. This could be due to the healthcare provider's unfamiliarity with disability or the assumption that women with disabilities are asexual in nature. Some women even reported receiving no guidance, education, or mere details on contraception, or it was assumed by medical staff that they would be sterilized. Women who have a spinal cord injury above the T6 vertebra can have autonomic dysreflexia during a pelvic exam which can be life-threatening. Women with intellectual disabilities are less likely to receive Pap smears because the process may be upsetting to the patient. By not being fully knowledgeable in these needs and possible threats to women with disabilities, medical professionals are negatively affecting the healthcare experience and treatment of these women.

In the case that the examination table cannot be lowered during a Pap smear, women with physical disabilities can use alternative examination positions during the procedure, such as knee-chest position, diamond-shaped position, M-shaped position and V-shaped position. These alternative procedures can accommodate women who are unable to position their feet into stirrups or need greater body support. In addition, lithotomy stirrups can be used for additional comfort.

The Welner table, designed by American obstetrician-gynecologist and disability rights activist Sandra Welner, is an examination table designed with a wider range of adjustments and positions to facilitate accessibility for both patients and doctors with physical disabilities. Welner also compiled the handbook, Welner's Guide to the care of women with disabilities.

== Accessing reproductive healthcare ==
A recent term coined reproductive violence is still being investigated, but would help to explain why women's self determination, right to knowledge, and right to basic accommodations. There is clear evidence that healthcare professionals do not leave their preconceived notions out of their practice at the costs women with disabilities.

Healthcare resources for women with disabilities include the CDC's Disability and Health Information for Women. The site has flyers promoting breast cancer and cervical cancer screenings. It also links to the Center for Research on Women with Disabilities. That site has a reproductive care section with information on accessing contraception, pregnancy and childbirth Q&As, and "well-woman" exams, as well as links to additional information, flyers and videos.

== Contraception ==
Contraceptives are used by women with intellectual disabilities for various reasons, including pregnancy prevention, menstrual suppression, and management of teratogenic medications. Women with intellectual disabilities may be more likely to use contraceptives or undergo a hysterectomy to manage menstruation. Different types of contraception are available to women with disabilities, but the prescription of a specific type of birth control is based on the type of disability and the associated side-effects. Women with disabilities, especially intellectually disabled, also face health literacy gaps at higher rates than non disabled women, giving them less access to sexual health information, ergo contraception.

Menstrual cycles are sometimes affected by different types of disabilities, such as rheumatoid arthritis. In addition, women who become disabled later in life sometimes experience transient menstrual disorders. To maintain the intersection of disabilities and other health issues, it is recommended that disabled women participate in patient tracking registries to make sure that they do not miss out on any routine preventative care, like contraception, or even screenings for certain diseases and cancers.

A study conducted in 1989 found that 19% of women with physical disabilities had been counseled on sexuality in a medical setting and were rarely offered information about contraceptives. Women with intellectual disabilities often lack both education about sexual health and the ability to learn about it informally. In addition, their medical providers are less likely to discuss contraception with them. Women with intellectual disabilities are often encouraged to use supported decision-making with family members or other support persons to determine their preferred contraceptive option.

Attitudes regarding disabled women accessing contraception range globally. For example, Zimbabwean women with disabilities faced negative attitudes about their reproductive health, such as those of female nurses who expressed the idea that "sex was not meant for the disabled." In India, the access of women's care is also low, holding a strong stigma against severe physical disabilities, as well as a social stigma against disability in general.

== Maternity care ==
Some studies have highlighted potential obstacles for pregnant women with disability. For example, a 1996 study discovered that over 50% of United States hospitals lacked the necessary infrastructure to cater to the needs of physically disabled pregnant women, which rendered their facilities inaccessible. These barriers may include lack of adjustable examination tables, wheelchair compatible features, and accessible weight scales.

More recent research has continued to demonstrate disparities that disabled pregnant women experience in accessing their maternity care. A 2017 study grouped barriers that physically-disabled pregnant women face into four main categories, or "levels." These levels include the practitioner level, in which medical professionals are unwilling to provide care, the clinical practice level, where there is a lack of accessible examination equipment, the system level, where there are specific time limits and coverage issues, and finally the barriers to research, specifically for disability-specific clinical data.

Expectant mothers with intellectual disabilities may need more specialized training and guidance in regards to childcare after they give birth. Important themes in training may include consistent formal obstetric training and education for both providers and mothers.

== Breast health ==
Many women with a disability do not regularly receive or are not regularly referred for breast cancer screenings. These women are still at risk of developing breast cancer. Therefore, access to breast health resources is crucial for women with disabilities.

Some women with disabilities may be unable to receive breast cancer screening due to financial concerns. It can also be difficult to access these screenings. For example, women with some physical disabilities may need to be referred to special mammography centers because most equipment is not designed to accommodate individuals who are unable to stand.

== Menopause and later life ==
In some instances, women with disabilities may experience menopause more severely. Specifically, women with intellectual disabilities have been found to be at risk for a broader range and more severe menopausal symptoms, especially when there are other underlying health issues at play.

Women with physical disabilities are at a greater risk of having lower bone mass and are at risk for osteoporosis. Women with ID and Down syndrome often go through menopause at an earlier age than other women. Women with various disabilities sometimes show different symptoms from decreased estrogen levels during menopause.

Loss of estrogen after menopause can also lead to a greater likelihood of urinary incontinence. Treatment and therapy interventions for incontinence have not been tested or modified for women with disabilities.

== See also ==
- Right to health
- Sexual and reproductive health and rights
- Gender and disability
- Sexuality and disability
