= K. Sankara Warrier =

Kalamandalam Sankara Warrier
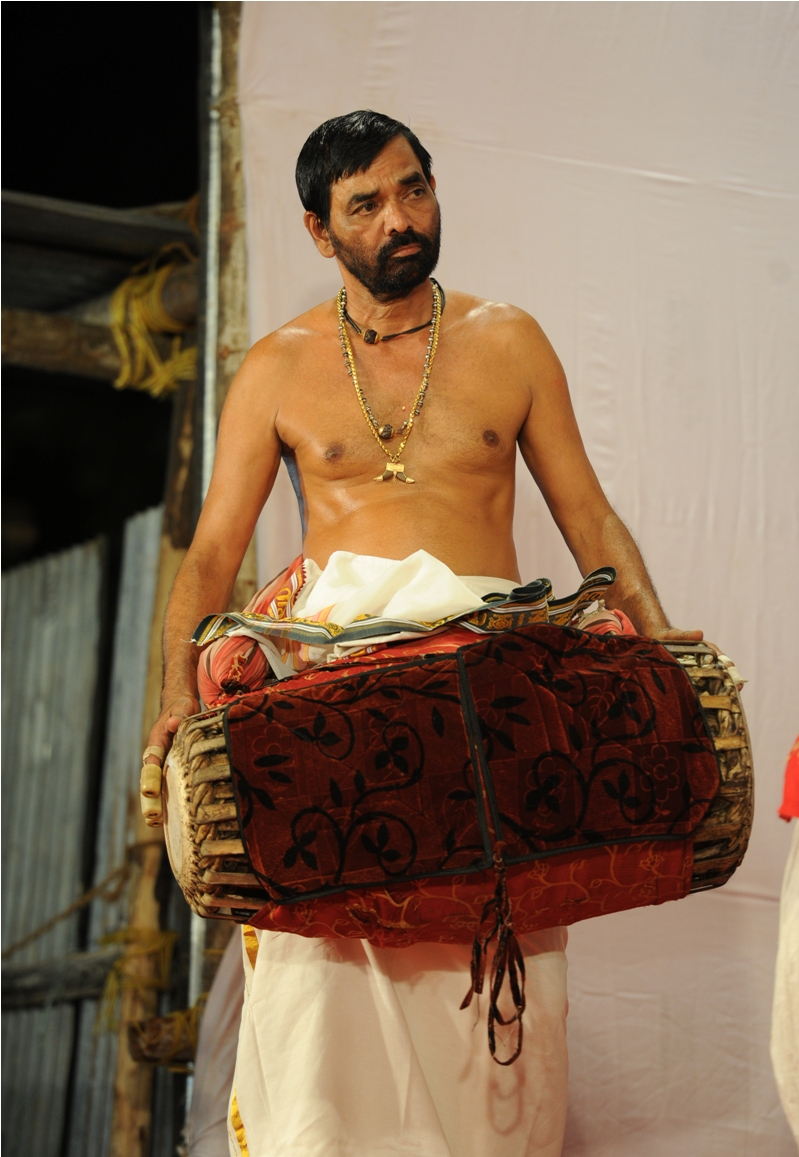

Background information
- Born: 1 June 1952 (age 74)
- Origin: Thillenkery, Kannur, Kerala, India
- Genres: Kathakali
- Instrument: Maddalam

Kalamandalam Sankara Warrier is an Indian percussionist of the Kerala ethnic drum called maddalam, and has specialised in its playing for the dance-drama of Kathakali.

== Personal life ==
Sankara Warrier was born on 1 June 1952, at Thillenkery, a small village in Kannur district of the Malabar region, to Krishna Warrier and Madhavi Warrasiar. He lives with his wife Valsala S Warrier in Eloor near Kochi where he worked for 18 years as a maddalam teacher in FACT Kathakali School. The couple have two sons.

== Career ==
Sankara Warrier joined Kalamandalam at the age of 15 and was trained in maddalam under masters like Kalamandalam Appukutty Poduval and Kalamandalam Narayanan Nambeesan. After his four-year course, Warrier joined Kalamandalam as a first grade maddalam teacher. In 1981, FACT (Fertilizers and Chemicals of Travancore Ltd) invited Warrier to join its Kathakali school as a maddalam teacher. Warrier worked in the FACT Kathakali School for 18 years. He retired in 2005. He has also been a maddalam percussionist in the classical ensemble Panchavadyam.

== Books ==
Sankara Warrier has written a book, Maddalam Enna Mangalavadyam, published in 2003 with the help of his alma mater.

== See also ==
- Maddalam
- Kathakali
- Kalamandalam Appukutty Poduval
- Maddalam and Chenda Keli
