= Velakali =

Traditional martial dance of Kerala

A velakali performance at Chirakkadavu Sree Mahadeva Temple.

Velakali is a traditional martial dance of Nair community of Kerala, India that is performed during temple festivals. Brightly dressed dancers wielding swords and shields depict a fight sequence between the Pandavas and Kauravas during the course of the dance.

== Myth behind Velakali ==
There are several legends associated with the origin and history of Velakali. One such legend talks of the sage Narada witnessing Lord Krishna and his friends staging a mock battle on the banks of the Kalindi using the stalks and leaves of the water lily as swords and shields. Narada then requested the sage Villumangalam to capture the martial vigour of the mock fight in a ritualistic performance for Krishna. Villumangalam in turn requested the ruler of Ambalapuzha to teach young men to perform the dance and so the ruler asked his army chieftains Mathoor Panicker and Velloor Kurup to ready a troupe of Velakali performers. Since the dancers were originally warriors, the dance bore a close resemblance to the martial art form of Kalarippayattu. Velakali thus originated in the princely state of Chempakassery (modern Ambalappuzha). To this day it is a regular feature of the pooram at the Ambalapuzha Sri Krishnaswamy temple. Since the annexation of Ambalappuzha into Travancore, Velakali has marked the commencement of the annual Painkuni festival at Sri Padmanabha Swamy Temple, Trivandrum.

== Performance ==
During a Velakali performance huge effigies representing the Pandavas are put up during the festival at the eastern entrance of the Padmanabhaswamy temple. In Ambalapuzha, the dance is choreographed under the guidance of Mathur Panickar a hereditary Asan and minister of the Ambalapuzha royal family. Velakali dancers represent the Kauravas and the dance represents the battle between the cousins. The dancers stop and beat a retreat once they reach the effigy of Yudhishthira. The performance represents the victory of dharma over adharma and the victory of Bheema over the Kauravas during their exile to the forest. The younger performers line up in the front and the elders make up the rear of the troupe with a group of flag bearers forming the rearmost line. The performers are also sometimes accompanied by replicas of animals like oxen that were used in warfare in the olden days. According to Alf Hiltebeitel, Velakali performances in central Travancore are reenactments of supposedly historical battles rather than the Mahabharata War and are intertwined with rituals of patayani. It is at the Padmanabhaswamy temple that the performances are linked with the battle between the cousins of the Mahabharata.

== Costumes ==
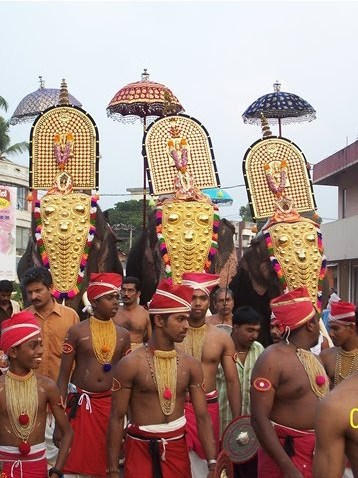
Velakali during Vazhappally aaraattu

Velakali is an all-male performance. The performers dress up in traditional clothes and colorful red headgear of the medieval Nair soldiers and wear cloth garlands of beads that cover their bare chests. They wield colorful shields and long canes or bear swords and dance to the beat of panchavadyam performers who accompany the performance and there are skilful displays of swordplay.

== Music ==
Velakali is performed to the accompaniment of panchavadyam which uses the maddalam, thavil, ilathalam, kombu and kuzhal. The music involves no lyrics and the artists move to the rhythm of the percussion instruments. Also, unlike most dance forms, bhava has no place in Velakali and the focus is solely on tala. Velakali involves several distinct movements such as the pidichakali, padakali and the vela ottam.

== Recent trends ==
Velakali requires of its performers considerable physical training and the knowledge of the use of arms. Education and employment opportunities had gradually led to fewer youngsters taking up Velakali resulting in its gradual decline. It has enjoyed a resurgence in recent years due to the efforts of Mohanankunju Panicker. The dance was staged again at the Sree Padmanabhaswamy Temple in Trivandrum in 2011 after a gap of almost 40 years.

== See also ==
- Kathakali
- Kalarippayattu
- Kerala
