= Darpana Academy of Performing Arts =

School in Ahmedabad, India

- Formation: 1949
- Founder: Mrinalini Sarabhai; Vikram Sarabhai
- Purpose: Dance school for Indian classical dance, theatre, puppetry
- Location: Usmanpura, Ahmedabad- 380013, Gujarat, India.
- Coordinates: 23°02′51″N 72°34′22″E
- Director: Mallika Sarabhai
- Website: darpana.com

Darpana Academy of Performing Arts is a school for performing arts in Ahmedabad, Gujarat, established by Mrinalini Sarabhai and Vikram Sarabhai in 1949, it has been directed by their daughter Mallika Sarabhai for the last three decades. The school organises a three-day Interart, the "Vikram Sarabhai International Arts Festival" at Ahmedabad, every year. It celebrated its golden jubilee on 28 December 1998, with the announcement of the annual "Mrinalini Sarabhai Award for Classical Excellence", in the field of classical dance.

== Naming ==
While "darpana" is the Hindi word for "mirror", the use here also references the "Abhinaya Darpana", "The Mirror of Gestures", Nandikeshvara's ancient text upon Indian stage-craft and dance.

== History ==
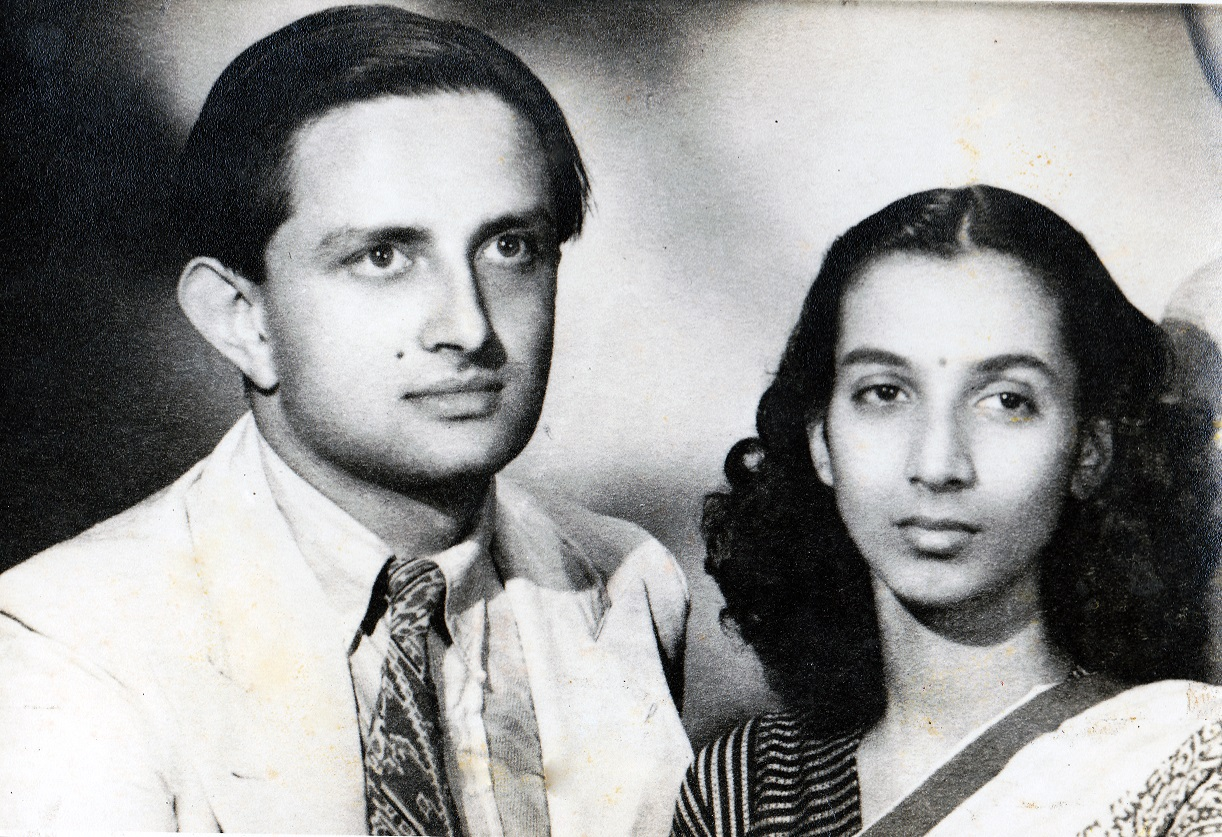
Founder of Darpana Academy Dr. Vikram Sarabhai and Mrinalini Sarabhai

The Darpana Academy of Performing Arts was founded in Ahmedabad, Gujarat, India by Vikram Sarabhai and his wife Mrinalini Sarabhai.

The work in using arts foe social change began at Darpana in the 1960s. Darpana's puppeteers started working with the central ministry of rural development in teaching village women the use of smokeless stove. The theatre department then run by Kailash Pandya created a play called Ma to rally people to the war effort. Mrinalini Sarabhai, in a radical departure from the spiritual core of the classical Bharat Natyam used the style to talk of the horror of dowry violence. Over the years two departments were established to focus the work of using the arts for change. Darpana for Development in 1980, today run by actor activist Jignesh Patel, and Darpana Communication in 2001 run by film maker Yadavan Chandran. In addition, in 2009 CRANTI (Citizens Resource and Action Initiative) was formed to give practical guidance to citizen to use the laws and tools available to them to fight their own battles, and to train people in the use of the Right To Information Act to solve daily problems of access and justice, run by Bharatsinh Jhala. During the last three decades, these departments have worked on over 51 projects all over India, reaching out to over 12.5 million people. The work has been in areas ranging from public health, women's empowerment, gender issues and education to the environment, human rights, communal harmony, good governance, citizen's participation in democracy, race, gender and disability. Through the use of television and film, theatrical and street performances, quizzes and debates, puppets and board games. They have been able to effectively talk about a range of sensitive issues from women and violence, to religious intolerance, the environment, human rights, corruption and justice.

The academy received UNESCO sponsorship to offer Artist Residency programs in 1999–2000 and 2005–2007. The academy was also listed by UNESCO an institution active in the "Protection of the World Cultural and Natural Heritage", and thereby invited to attend the subsequent Intergovernmental Committee meetings.

In 1962, Achyut Kanvinde was commissioned by Sarabhai to design the building of the academy.

== Activities ==
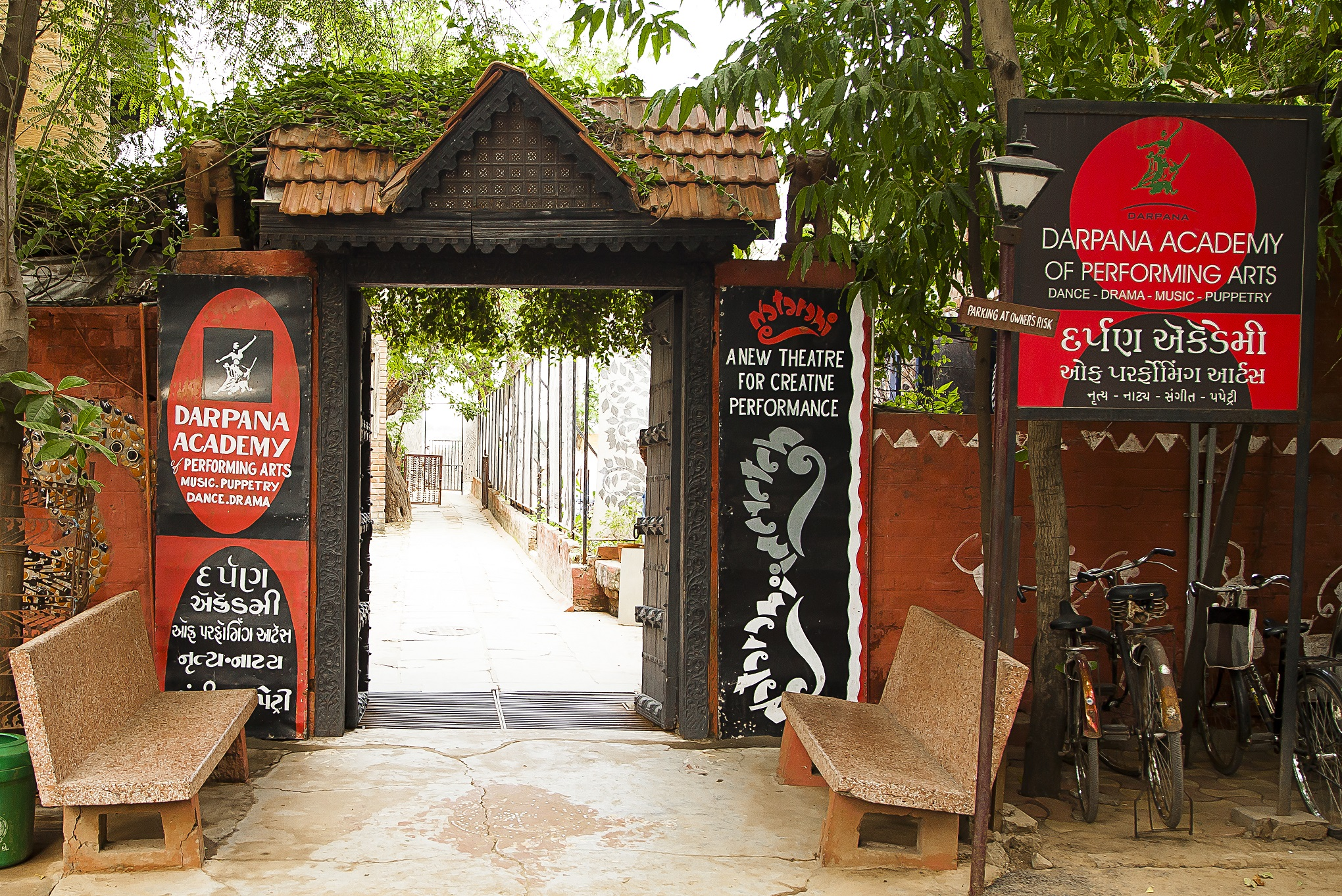
dance academy

The academy offers courses in Indian classical dance Bharatanatyam, Indian Classical Vocal, Mridangam, Violin and Flute, puppetry and martial art Kalaripayattu. Its departments range from performance and teaching of the arts, to the use of performance and arts as development communication, through face-to-face impact and software production.

The Drama Section, under acting duo Kailash Pandya and Damini Mehta, is responsible for more than 100 productions of a wide variety.

Darpana attracted young writers and staged their first scripts, making them an integral part of production efforts. Some of the names can be mentioned as Madhu Rye, Labhshankar Thakar, Shrikant Shah, Subhash Shah, Chinu Modi, and Hasmukh Baradi. It also conducted theatre-training courses for over two decades.

Its research wing, Janvak, published monographs like Goverdhan Panchal's on Bhavai. Darpana has also built an experimental thrust auditorium, Natrani, reminiscent of Greek amphitheatres, on the banks of the river Sabarmati.

== List of Kathakali artists and musicians who worked in Darpana since 1949 ==
- Guru Vazhenkada Kunchu Nair,
- Kavungal Shankarankutty Panicker,
- Guru Kottakkal Gopi Nair,
- Kottakkal Appu Nair,
- V.P. Ramakrishnan,
- Chandramana Govindan Namboodiri,
- Mankombu Sivashankara Pillai,
- Kalamandalam Govindan Kutty,
- Kalamandalam Murali,
- Kalamandalam Gopinath,
- Kavungal Chathunni Panicker,
- Kalamandalam Ravindra Warrior,
- Kalamandalam Madhavan,
- Kalamandalam Bhaskara Menon,
- Thakazhi Kuttan Pillai,
- Kalamandalam Unnikrishna Kurup,
- Kalamandalam Subrahmanian,
- Kalamandalam Sukumaran,
- Kalamandalam Haridas,
- Kottakkal Narayanan Namboodiri,
- Kavungal Gopala Panicker,
- Kavungal Krishna Panicker,
- Kalamandalam Narayanan,
- Kalamandalam Ananda Narayanan,
- Kalamandalam Sasi Poduval,
- Kalamandalam Balaraman,
- Kalamandalam Anandan,
- Thichur Vasu Variar,
- V.P. Shankara Narayanan,
- Kalamandalam Shivaraman Nair,
- Kalamandalam Devaki,
- Kalamandalam Sitalakshmi,
- Painkulam Narayana Chakkyar,
- Kalamandalam Hariharan,
- Kalamandalam Kalyanikutti Amma,
- Kottakkal Sasidharan Nair
