= State of the African Woman Campaign =

The State of the African Woman Campaign (SoAWC) is funded by the European Union, and its implementation is led by the International Planned Parenthood Federation Africa Region (IPPF AR). The project is a communication tool, an advocacy campaign and awareness creation that focuses on the implementation of girls and women's rights, particularly the Maputo Protocol and Maputo Plan of Action, in Africa.

== Who We Are ==
At the heart of SoAWC project is the #RightByHer campaign that create a coalition of SRHR activist from the youth sector, feminist groups and faith organisations.

The #RightByHer campaign influences both legal and social norms on women's rights in Africa. The campaign tasks CSO's to intensify public pressure on policy makers for improved transparency, accountability and implementation of policies on women's rights.

== Rights Areas ==
The Four(4) Rights Areas covered by the campaign includes the following:

1. Gender Based Violence (GBV) against Women
2. Reproductive Rights and SRH (Sexual Reproductive Health)
3. Harmful Practices
4. HIV and AIDS
