= Krishnankutty Poduval =

Indian musician

Kalamandalam Krishnankutty Poduval (1924-1992) was a self-taught maestro of Kathakali percussion who excelled in the art of chenda playing by redefining its aesthetics as an audio accompaniment for the classical dance-drama from Kerala in south India.

Poduval, who was born in the Kathakali village of Vellinezhi in Palakkad district, was groomed in chenda playing by legendary Moothamana Kesavan Namboodiri and Pattikkamthodi Ravunni Menon, in whose classrooms he underwent training in playing the percussion instrument. He had earlier received basic training in chenda under Chamrankulangara Appu Marar.

Poduval has been credited with lending audio support on the chenda to emotional scenes on the Kathakali stage. His art, in tandem with the late maddalam maestro Kalamandalam Appukutty Poduval, won wide appreciation from audiences. Together, they used to prop up the performance of the renowned master, Padma Bhushan Kalamandalam Ramankutty Nair.

A recipient f the Central Sangeet Natak Akademi Award, the Kerala Sangeetha Nataka Akademi Award (1971), and the Kerala Sangeetha Nataka Akademi Fellowship (1986), Krishnankutty Poduval groomed several disciples at Kerala Kalamandalam from where he retired as professor in the late 1980s. Ayamkudi Kuttappa Marrar and Kalamandalam Kesavan are considered to be his main disciples.

Krishnankutty Poduval had more than once quit Kalamandalam following differences with its authorities. During such breaks, he used to also work with Gandhi Seva Sadan Kathakali Akademi.

Poduval died on October 14, 1992, in an Ernakulam hospital following an acute liver problem.

In May 2008, his alma mater brought out a book "Melapperukkam" carrying the complete written works of Kalamandalam Krishnankutty Poduval.

Two of Poduval's sons are artistes in the field of Kathakali. Kalamandalam Mohanakrishnan is a musician, while Kalamandalam Vijayakrishnan is a chenda player.
