= Kalamandalam Devaki =

Indian Ottan Thullal dancer (1946–2023)

- Born: 25 November 1946; Nelluvai, Thrissur district, Kingdom of Cochin, India
- Died: 7 April 2023 (aged 76); Thrissur, Kerala, India
- Occupation: Ottan Thullal dancer
- Known for: Ottan Thullal
- Awards: Kerala Sangeetha Nataka Akademi Award, Kerala Kalamandalam Award, Kunchan Memorial Award

Kalamandalam Devaki (25 November 1946 – 7 April 2023) was an Indian exponent of the Ottan Thullal dance and song tradition. She was the first woman artist in this male-dominated field. She was awarded the Kalamandalam prize and the Kerala Sangeetha Nataka Akademi Award.

== Early life ==
Devaki was born on November 25, 1946, in Nelluvai, Thrissur district, Kerala to Kadambur Damodaran Nair and Vaduthala Narayani Amma. She came from an artistic family: her uncle Kalamandalam Gopalan Nair was a Kathakali performer and teacher, while her father Kadambur Damodaran Nair was an actor and bhagavatar in Kottakal. At an early age, she began instruction in dance at Lalitha Kalalayam in her village.

At age twelve, she joined the Kerala Kalamandalam as its first woman student to learn Thullal in 1960. Her arangettam was a performance of Paatracharitham in 1961.

Her guru was Malabar Kannan Nair. Her training involved dance, as well as Sanskrit, abhinaya and sahitya. In particular, she concentrated on mudras, which are not as explicit in Ottan Thullal as in Kathakali. She trained in Kathakali under Ramankutty Nair.

Devaki married Kalamandalam Narayanan Nair Nelluvai, a maddalam artist.

== Career ==
Devaki continued her work after marriage. She studied Kuchipudi under Mrinalini Sarabhai, in whose Darpana Academy of Performing Arts her husband had become a member.

Following her graduation from the Kerala Kalamandalam in 1964, she was invited by Milena Salvini, a French teacher of Kathakali, to perform in Paris. She joined the staff of the Kalamandalam as a teacher, where she worked for three years.

Returning to Nelluvai, Devaki became widely sought as a Thullal maestro, both for instruction and performance. She established the Dhanwanthari Kalaakshetram, a dance institute.
