= Appukutty Poduval =

Indian musician

Kalamandalam Appukutty Poduval (1924–2008) was a maddalam maestro who rose to prominence by his aesthetically pleasing taps on the instrument—a vital percussion accompaniment for Kathakali, the classical dance-drama from Kerala in south India. A disciple of the legendary Venkichan Swami, he, along with chenda exponent, Kalamandalam Krishnankutty Poduval, ushered in a new spring in the acoustics of their performing art.

A native of the temple town of Thiruvilwamala in Thrissur district, Poduval served for long as a maddalam tutor at his alma mater, Kerala Kalamandalam. His noted disciples at the institute include Paloor Achuthan Nair, Kalamandalam Narayanan Nambisan (Nambisan Kutty), Damodaran Nair, Eachara Varrier, Nelluvaya Narayanan Nair, Kalamandalam Sankara Warrier, Kaplingat Vasudevan Namboothiri, Ramadas and Sasi.

Poduval retired from Kalamandalam in 1986. He later worked, on and off, as visiting teacher at Sadanam Kathakali Akademi (Gandhi Seva Sadan) east of Ottapalam. He received the Kerala Sangeetha Nataka Akademi Award in 1973 and the Sangeet Natak Akademi Award in 2000.

Poduval died on 27 January 2008.
