= Kavungal Chathunni Panicker =

Indian classical dancer

- Born: 1922; Thichur, Vadakkancherry, India
- Died: 27 November 2007 (aged 84–85); Erumappetty, Thrissur, Kerala, India
- Occupation: Classical dancer
- Years active: 1936-?
- Known for: Kathakali
- Awards: Padma Shri; Sangeet Natak Akademi Award; Kerala State Kathakali Award; Kerala Kalamandalam Fellowship; Kerala Sangeetha Nataka Akademi Fellowship; Gujarat Sangeet Natak Akademi Award

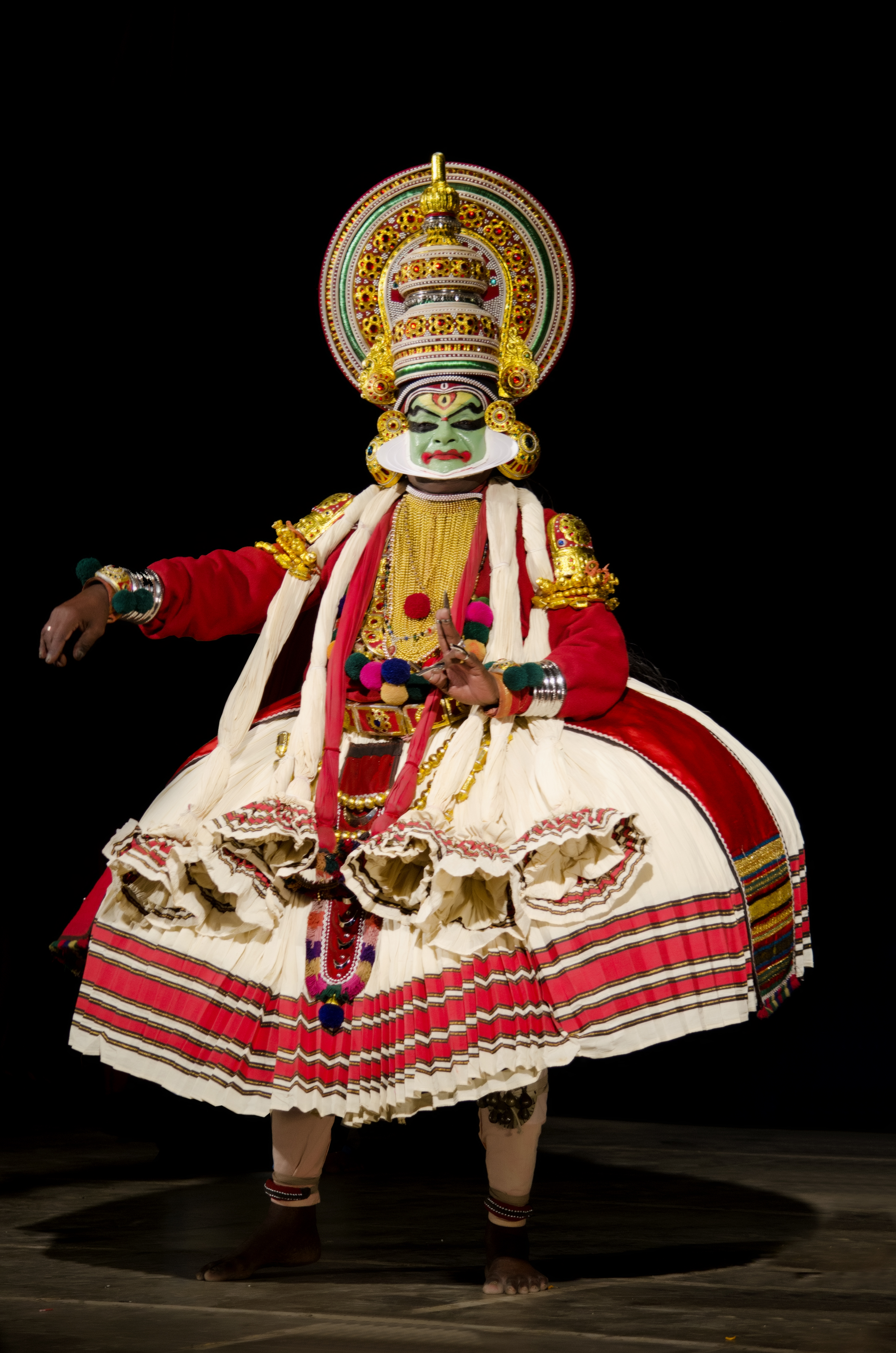
A Kathakali performer

Kavungal Chathunni Panicker (1922-2007) was an Indian classical dancer, known for his proficiency in Kathakali, the traditional dance form of Kerala. He was an exponent of the Kavungal School of Kathakali (Kavungal Kalari), noted for its rigorous training methods and overt physical interpretation of abhinaya. He is known to have brought innovations to the dance form, especially in the decorative movements (kalasam) and his contributions are reported in the development of grammar and costumes for the Kavungal School. A recipient of the Sangeet Natak Akademi Award in 1973, Panicker was honored again by the Government of India, in 2006, with the fourth highest Indian civilian award of Padma Shri.

== Biography ==
Secondary characters were criticised often by Kathakali scholars, they attained the significance of perfected lead roles when Chathunni Panicker handled them, writes K. P. S. Menon, renowned art historian.

Kavungal Chathunni Panicker was born in 1922 in the small hamlet of Thichur, near Vadakkancherry in Thrissur district in the South Indian state of Kerala. He started learning Kathakali in 1933, at the age of eleven, under the tutelage of Sankara Panicker, his uncle, where he stayed for three years and later under Katambur Gopalan Nair. His debut performance was in 1936 at the age of 14. In six years time, aged 20, Panicker formed his own troupe.

In 1947, Panicker and his troupe rendered a performance in Ooty, a hill station in the state of Tamil Nadu where he had the opportunity to meet Vikram Sarabhai, Indian scientist and his wife, Mrinalini Sarabhai, renowned classical dancer and the founder of Darpana Academy of Performing Arts, Ahmedabad. The next year, Panicker received invitation from Mrinalini Sarabhai to join the institution as its principal. He accepted the offer and stayed with Darpana till his retirement in 1985. The association assisted him to travel with the group, perform at various countries around the world and associate with the group's experimental productions such as Manushyan. He continued his kathakali performance during his stint at Ahmedabad and is known to have had several notable performances such as Hanuman in Kalyana Saugandhikam and Thoranayudham, Raudrabhima in Duryodhana Vadham and Kattala (Hunter) in Nalacharitham and Kiratham.

After returning to Kerala, he tried to found a school for kathakali, but suffered a stroke which incapacitated him, leaving the effort unfinished. Chathunni Panicker died on 29 November 2007, succumbing to illnesses that dogged him for three months, at a hospital in Erumapetty, near his native village of Thichur, leaving his wife, their two children and many of his disciples.

== Awards and recognitions ==
Chathunni Panicker received the Sangeet Natak Akademi Award from the Government of India in 1973. This was followed by the Gujarat State Sangeet Natak Akademi Award and Kerala Kalamandalam Fellowship. Kerala Sangeetha Nataka Akademi Fellowship in 2003. The next year, in 2004, he received Kerala State Kathakali Award from the Government of Kerala. Panicker, who is reported to have been presented an amulet and medal by Jawaharlal Nehru, former Prime Minister of India, was included in the Republic Day honours list by the Government of India, in 2006, for the civilian honour of Padma Shri.

== See also ==
- Kathakali
- Indian classical dance
