= Manakkattu Bhadra Temple =

Hindu temple in Kerala

Manakkattu Sree Bhadra Temple
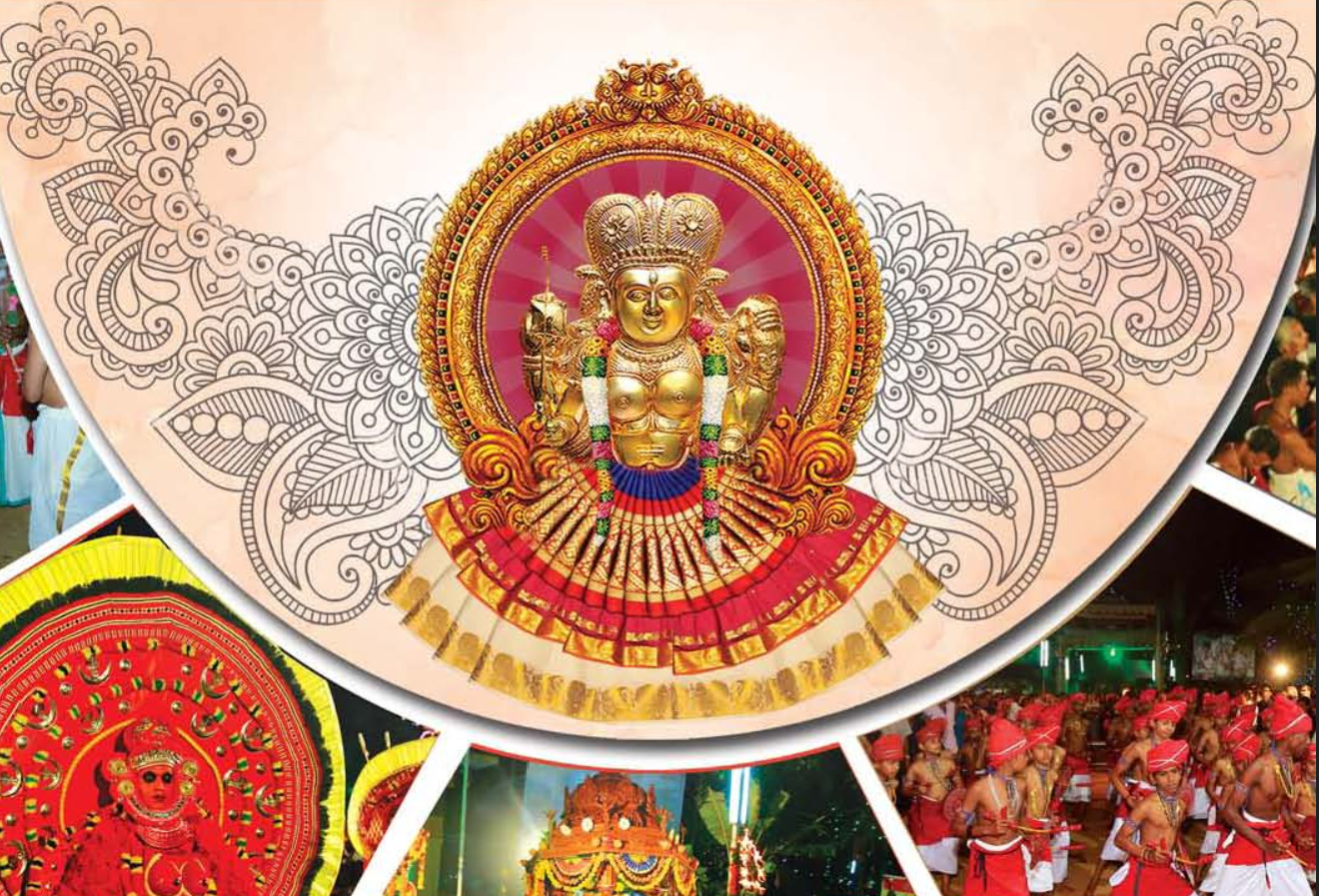

- Manakkattu Bhadra Temple, Chirakkadavu, Kottayam, Kerala

Religion
- Affiliation: Hinduism
- District: Kottayam
- Deity: Bhadrakali
- Festivals: Thiruvutsavam in Dhanu, Pongala, Mandala festival
- Governing body: Committee of representatives of Vellala Mahasabha

Location
- Location: Chirakkadavu
- State: Kerala
- Country: India
- Interactive map of Manakkattu Sree Bhadra Temple
- Coordinates: 9°32′25.6″N 76°46′43.2″E

Architecture
- Type: Traditional Kerala style
- Completed: c. early 19th century

Specifications
- Temple: One
- Elevation: 62.49 m (205 ft)

Website
- Manakkattu Sreebhadra Temple : Pooja Booking

Manakkattu Sree Bhadra Temple is a Hindu temple located in Chirakkadavu village near Ponkunnam in Kottayam district in the Indian state of Kerala. Goddess Bhadrakali presides there in the form of "Manakkattuamma". Devi provides "Sree" (wealth/prosperity) and "Bhadratha" (security) to the devotees equally. The temple is famous for daily Guruthi Pooja & is a major pitstop for Sabarimala pilgrims with Annadana (offering free food).

== Legend ==
The present structure is believed to be built in the early 19th century. According to the legend, once a saint lived in Chirakkadavu village and he belonged to the Thaingannoor family. He was mastered to control certain supernatural forces like Yakshis, Gandharvas and ghosts. He was often invited to distant regions to perform rituals to control them. He used to place these spirits in a "Kanjiram" tree (i.e. nux-vomica tree) or in an idol and consecrate them at appropriate spots. One day, a Yakshi who was installed in an idol begged to the saint to release her. She promised him that she wouldn't do any harm and will accompany him to his house.

Upon her request, the saint took her to his house and instructed to stay in the "Arapura" (central room). But the saint put a magical thread as a precaution if she violates her promise that she wouldn't harm anybody. Yakshi wasn't pleased with the action of saint and thus she too put some conditions that the Arapura must be preserved like a shrine and nobody should enter the house without talking a bath. Low cast people shouldn't enter or touch the saint within the Padippura (entrance) of the house. If any of these conditions are not obeyed, she will get free from the magical thread and will do anything.

The saint agreed to the conditions of Yakshi and she started staying in his house. She was only visible to the saint and his aged mother. The mother saw her as a beautiful young girl and she thought that the girl was brought by his son to help her. One day, the saint went for a long journey. He returned to his house after a long time. By seeing his master after a long time, one of the saint's labors accidentally came in joy and touched him within the Padippura. By seeing this, the Yakshi who was staying in the Arapura immediately disappeared from the house.

After getting released, the Yakshi started to harm the villagers and she spread various contagious diseases like small pox. By seeing the pathetic situation, the helpless saint along with some chieftains went in search for a person who could find a solution for the chaotic situation. They finally reached the "Manakkattu Mana" and told the situations to the "Karanavar" (head). The Karanavar instructed them to build a shrine for Goddess Bhadrakali in their village and that was the only way to avoid further troubles from the evil spirit.

They returned to their village and erected a small Sreekovil as per the instructions of Karanavar of Manakkattu Mana. The Karanavar was summoned to the village after constructing the shrine. He consecrated a "Kannadibhimbam" idol, made of Panchaloha and invoked the energy of Sree Bhadra Devi into it. Idols of "Kodumkali" and Yakshi were installed near to Sree Bhadra Devi. After the installation of Devi, the Karanavar appointed a Velichappadu, who represents Devi and a Pujari (chief priest) to do the Poojas. The Thantri performed "Panthirukulam gurithi" and he distributed the guruthitheertham (sacred water) to the village folks as a cure to the contagious diseases. He also instructed the villagers to perform this guruthi after every twelve years in order to avoid further misfortune incidents.

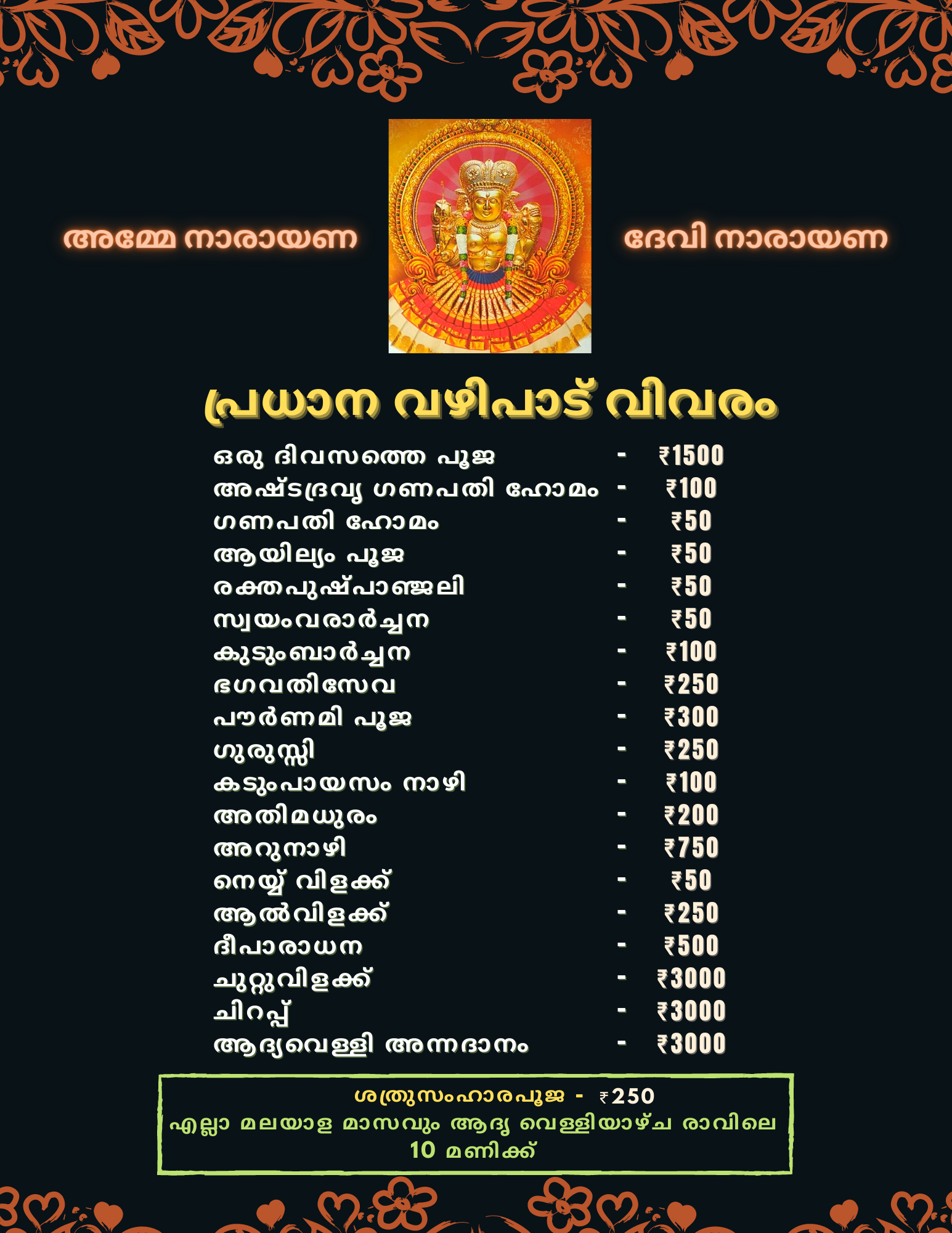
List of Major Offerings

== Location ==
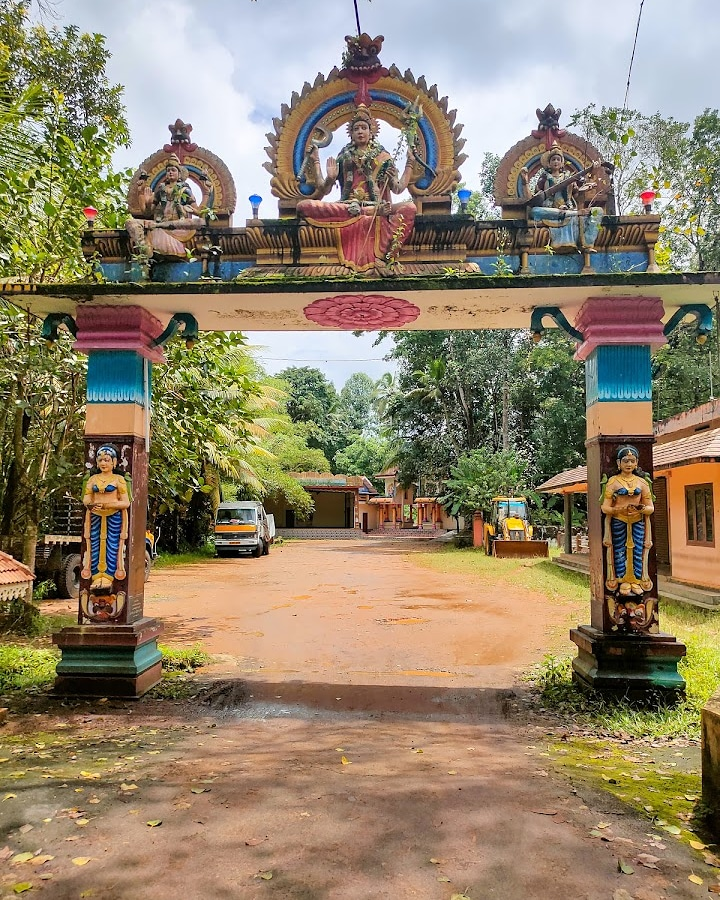
The temple is located 4 km from Ponkunnam and 10 km from Erumely, on Ponkunnam - Mannamplavu road

== Deity ==
Apart from Bhadrakali, Durga, Bhuvanesvari, Nagaraja, Nagadevatha, Rakshassu and Vishnumaya are the subordinate deities in the temple.

== Festivals ==
Mandala festival in December and "Pongala" in April are the noted festivals of the temple. Thiruvutsavam or annual festival is hosted in the Malayalam month of Dhanu (i.e. December).
