= Sandra Welner =

American physician, inventor

- Born: 1958; Pittsburgh, Pennsylvania, US
- Died: 2001 (aged 42–43); Washington, DC, US
- Resting place: Allegheny County, Pennsylvania, US
- Education: Lehigh University, Medical College of Pennsylvania
- Known for: disabled women's healthcare, inventor of the Welner table
- Scientific career
- Fields: Physician, Inventor
- Workplaces: Georgetown University, University of Maryland

Sandra Welner (1958–2001) was an American physician, inventor, and advocate for disabled women's healthcare.

== Early life and education ==
Sandra Leah Welner was raised in Pittsburgh, Pennsylvania, the daughter of Nikodem and Barbara Safier Welner. Her parents were both Polish-born and British-educated; her father was a civil engineer, and her mother was a nurse. Sandra graduated from Hillel Academy in 1975, as valedictorian and a National Merit Scholar. Welner enrolled in an accelerated medical education program, where she completed undergraduate work at Lehigh University, and earned her medical degree from the Medical College of Pennsylvania, in 1981 (at age 22). She completed further training in her specialty, obstetrics and gynecology, at Yale University.

== Career ==
Welner began her career as a surgeon and an infertility specialist, directing a women's clinic in Atlanta, Georgia. In 1987, she experienced a cardiac arrest while at a hospital in the Netherlands. Complications afterwards led to neurological impairments, particularly affecting mobility, vision, and fine-motor skills. After bleak initial prognosis and five years of rehabilitation, she was eventually able to resume a career in medicine, if not as a surgeon. (She continued to use a cane and other supports.)

Welner's practice after her injury focused on primary care for disabled women. Her Washington D.C. location allowed Welner to consult with federal agencies, and with the American Cancer Society and other national organizations. She was also an assistant professor of obstetrics and gynecology at Georgetown University and University of Maryland medical schools. She authored several journal articles and contributed to two books about women's health and disability. Her handbook, Welner's Guide to the Care of Women with Disabilities was published posthumously.

Welner's work with disabled women patients led her to invent the Welner table, a universally-accessible examination table that adjusts in position and height, for easier transfers from a wheelchair. The table also serves the disabled physician, by allowing a wider range of positions for performing examinations.

== Works ==
=== Journal articles ===
- Welner, Sandra; DeCherney, Alan H.; Polan, Mary Lake (January 1988). "Human menopausal gonadotropins: A justifiable therapy in ovulatory women with long-standing idiopathic infertility". American Journal of Obstetrics and Gynecology. 158 (1): 111–117. doi:10.1016/0002-9378(88)90789-2. PMID 3122578.
- Welner, Sandra L. (1997). "Gynecologic Care and Sexuality Issues for Women with Disabilities". Sexuality and Disability. 15 (1): 33–40. doi:10.1023/A:1024715514119. S2CID 189865719.
- Welner, Sandra L. (April 1998). "Screening Issues in Gynecologic Malignancies for Women with Disabilities: Critical Considerations". Journal of Women's Health. 7 (3): 281–285. doi:10.1089/jwh.1998.7.281. PMID 9580906.
- Welner, Sandra (1998). "Reproductive endocrinology and disability: the effect of disability on menstrual cyclicity and fertility". Infertility and Reproductive Medicine Clinics of North America. 9. W.B. Saunders Company: 689–698.
- Welner, Sandra L.; Foley, Catherine C.; Nosek, Margaret A.; Holmes, Ann (1999). "Practical Considerations in the Performance of Physical Examinations on Women With Disabilities". Obstetrical & Gynecological Survey. 54 (7): 457–462. doi:10.1097/00006254-199907000-00025. ISSN 0029-7828. PMID 10394583.
- Welner, Sandra L. (1999). "Contraceptive Choices for Women with Disabilities". Sexuality and Disability. 17 (3): 209–214. doi:10.1023/A:1022124804968. S2CID 67997926.
- Welner, Sandra L. (1999). "Menopausal Issues". Sexuality and Disability. 17 (3): 259–267. doi:10.1023/A:1022185123624. S2CID 189865182.
- Welner, Sandra L. (1999). "Conducting a Physical Examination on a Woman with a Disability". Sexuality and Disability. 17 (3): 199–203. doi:10.1023/A:1022120704060. S2CID 141185485.
- Welner, Sandra L. (1999). "Infertility and Management Approaches for Women with Disabilities". Sexuality and Disability. 17 (3): 233–236. doi:10.1023/A:1022181022715. S2CID 146531887.
- Welner, Sandra L. (1999). "Managing the Menstrual Cycle in Women with Disabilities". Sexuality and Disability. 17 (3): 205–207. doi:10.1023/A:1022172720898. S2CID 143239949.
- Welner, Sandra L. (2000). "Sexually Transmitted Infections in Women with Disabilities: Diagnosis, Treatment, and Prevention: A Review". Sexually Transmitted Diseases. 27 (5): 272–277. doi:10.1097/00007435-200005000-00007. ISSN 0148-5717. PMID 10821600. S2CID 23512681.
- Welner, Sandra L.; Simon, James A.; Welner, Barbara (2002). "Maximizing health in menopausal women with disabilities". Menopause. 9 (3): 208–219. doi:10.1097/00042192-200205000-00009. ISSN 1072-3714. PMID 11973444. S2CID 13652574.

=== Books and chapters ===
- Welner, Sandra L. (1993). "Neurologic Syndromes Affecting Spinal Cord Function". In Florence Haseltine; Sandra S. Cole; David B. Gray (eds.). Reproductive issues for persons with physical disabilities. Baltimore: Paul H. Brookes Publishing Company. pp. 275 et. seq. ISBN 9781557661111.
- Welner, Sandra L. (1998). "Caring for the woman with a disability". In Lila A. Wallis; Anne Sharnoff Kasper (eds.). Textbook of women's health. Philadelphia, PA: Lippincott-Raven. pp. 87–92. ISBN 9780316919913.
- Sandra L. Welner; Florence Haseltine, eds. (2004). Welner's Guide to the care of women with disabilities. Philadelphia: Lippincott Williams & Wilkins. ISBN 978-0781735322.

== Personal life ==
Welner's brothers Michael Welner and Alan Welner are also physicians (Michael a forensic psychiatrist, Alan a physiatrist).

Sandra Welner died in 2001, in Washington DC, from extensive burns sustained in an apartment fire after a candle flame came in contact with loose clothing. She was buried at Parkway Jewish Center Cemetery in Allegheny County, Pennsylvania.

== Legacy ==
The professional handbook Welner was co-editing (with Florence Haseltine) before her death, Welner's Guide to the Care of Women with Disabilities, was published by Lippincott Williams & Wilkins in 2003.

In 2004, she was inducted posthumously into the National Hall of Fame for Persons with Disabilities, in Columbus, Ohio.

The Welner table is in production and can be found in clinics worldwide, especially in her home city, at the Center for Women with Disabilities at Magee-Women's Hospital.

Welner's longtime friend, Jeffrey Lovitky, was lead attorney in a successful case, American Council of the Blind v. Paulson, brought in 2002 by the American Council of the Blind; the court's 2006 ruling requiring the United States Treasury Department to redesign paper money for blind users was upheld on appeal in 2008. Lovitky mentioned in interviews that his memories of Welner's experiences handling money were one reason that he took the case.
