= Doctor's office =

General medical practice

An examination room in a typical doctor's office. Note the examination table, a key feature of almost all such rooms worldwide.

A doctor's office in American English, a doctor's surgery in British English, or a doctor's practice, is a medical facility in which one or more medical doctors, usually general practitioners (GP), receive and treat patients.

== Description ==
Doctors' offices are the primary place where ambulatory care is given, and are often the first place that a sick person would go for care, except in an emergency, in which case one would go to an emergency department at a hospital.

In developed countries, where health services are guaranteed by the state in some form, most medical visits to doctors take place in their offices. In the United States, where this is not the case, many people who cannot afford health insurance or doctor's visits must either go to free or reduced-cost clinics or an emergency department at a hospital for care, instead of a doctor's office.

For healthy people, most visits to doctors' offices revolve around a once-yearly recommended physical examination. This exam usually consists of gathering information such as a patient's blood pressure, heart rate, weight, and height, along with checking for any irregularities or signs of illness around the body. GPs will also ask the patients about any mental health problems that they may be experiencing, and may refer them to a psychiatrist for further examination in the event that they do indeed have such problems. If there are any other health problems that must be addressed by a medical specialist, such as a cardiologist, a referral will be given.

The staff of a doctor's office usually consists of nurses, receptionists, and doctors. Sometimes, many doctors of different medical specialties may be housed in one building, allowing easy referrals.

== Facilities ==
Doctors' offices can range from spartan to luxurious. A basic office usually consists of a waiting room and examination room(s). Examination rooms usually consist of an examination table, upon which the patient sits or lies down, and various other equipment, depending on the office. Examples of the equipment found in an examination room include:

- Adhesive bandages
- Antiseptics
- Blood pressure cuff
- Cotton pads
- Cotton swabs
- Disinfectant
- Eye chart
- First aid kit
- Gauze
- Gloves
- Hand sanitizer
- Hygiene wipes
- Hypodermic needles
- Microscope
- Ophthalmoscope
- Otoscope
- Reflex hammer
- Scale
- Sink
- Stethoscope
- Sharps container
- Stadiometer
- Test tubes
- Thermometer
- Tissues
- Tongue depressor
- Tuning fork
- Tweezers
- X-ray
