= Declaration of Sexual Rights =

The Declaration of Sexual Rights is a statement on sexual rights that was first proclaimed at the 13th World Congress of Sexology, run by the World Association for Sexual Health (WAS), in Valencia 1997. A revised version was approved in 1999 in Hong Kong by the WAS General Assembly, and reaffirmed in 2008. It was revised and expanded in 2014.

== Latest version ==
The 2014 version names 16 positions:

1. The right to equality and non-discrimination
2. The right to life, liberty, and security of the person
3. The right to autonomy and bodily integrity
4. The right to be free from torture and cruel, inhuman, or degrading treatment or punishment
5. The right to be free from all forms of violence and coercion
6. The right to privacy
7. The right to the highest attainable standard of health, including sexual health; with the possibility of pleasurable, satisfying, and safe sexual experiences
8. The right to enjoy the benefits of scientific progress and its application
9. The right to information
10. The right to education and the right to comprehensive sexuality education
11. The right to enter, form, and dissolve marriage and similar types of relationships based on equality and full and free consent
12. The right to decide whether to have children, the number and spacing of children, and to have the information and the means to do so
13. The right to the freedom of thought, opinion, and expression
14. The right to freedom of association and peaceful assembly
15. The right to participation in public and political life
16. The right to access to justice, remedies, and redress

== Original version ==
The original, 1999 Declaration of Sexual Rights contained 11 positions:

1. The right to sexual freedom
2. The right to sexual autonomy, sexual integrity, and safety of the sexual body
3. The right to sexual privacy
4. The right to sexual equity
5. The right to sexual pleasure
6. The right to emotional sexual expression
7. The right to sexually associate freely
8. The right to make free and responsible reproductive choices
9. The right to sexual information based upon scientific inquiry
10. The right to comprehensive sexuality education
11. The right to sexual health care

== Historical context ==
The Declaration of Sexual Rights was published after a series of efforts to acknowledge sexual rights, specifically the right to sexual pleasure, during and after the HIV/AIDS crisis. Prior to its publication in 1999, sociologist, sex educator and American Humanist Lester Kirkendall published his 1976 book, "A New Bill of Sexual RIghts and Responsibilities." Kirkendall's Bill of Sexual Rights and Responsibilities was signed by several American sexologists, many of whom revised and re-signed an updated declaration in 2003. This bill of rights also placed an emphasis on sexual equity and pleasure.

== Revisions ==
The declaration, in its original form, was created with the goal of defining sexual rights to the WAS' members and create a tool for the promotion of sexual rights at a governmental level. The 2014 version was created with the intention of building upon established rights with international development goals and the sentiment that recognizing human rights plays an integral role in recognizing sexual rights.

== Reception ==
The declaration in its original form was accepted by LGBT+ news media as a "constitution for queers" and an aid to self-determination efforts after the AIDS crisis. Most available records of news coverage are from queer news outlets such as Xtra! magazine.

== Official Translations ==
The declaration has been translated into different languages including Chinese, Arabic, French, Greek, Russian, and Malayalam. The translations have been undertaken by volunteer translators and reviewers. The official translations are available on the WAS website.

== Similar works ==
Logo for the International Planned Parenthood Federation, which released its own declaration of sexual rights after meetings in 2007.

The International Planned Parenthood Federation released its own declaration, entitled Sexual Rights: An IPPF Declaration. This declaration was created with the intention of advancing the United Nations Millennium Development Goals, by reducing stigma and acting as a tool for policymakers. It was prepared for the 2015 UNESCO International Conference on Population and Development. This version of the declaration relied on seven guiding principals:

1. Sexuality is an integral part of the personhood of every human being, for this reason a favourable environment in which everyone may enjoy all sexual rights as part of the process of development must be created
2. The rights and protections guaranteed to people under age eighteen differ from those of adults, and must take into account the evolving capacities of the individual child to exercise rights on his or her own behalf.
3. Non-discrimination underlines all human rights protection and promotion.
4. Sexuality, and pleasure deriving from it, is a central aspect of being human, whether or not a person chooses to reproduce.
5. Ensuring sexual rights for all includes a commitment to freedom and protection from harm.
6. Sexual rights may be subject only to those limitations determined by law for the purpose of securing due recognition and respect for the rights and freedoms of others and the general welfare in a democratic society
7. The obligations to respect, protect and fulfil apply to all sexual rights and freedoms.

== See also ==
- Declaration on Sexual Pleasure
