= Michael Welner =

American forensic psychiatrist and writer (born 1964)

- Born: September 24, 1964 (age 62); Pittsburgh, Pennsylvania, U.S.
- Education: University of Miami (BS); University of Miami School of Medicine (MD)
- Years active: 1988 – present
- Spouse: Orli Welner
- Medical career
- Profession: Psychiatrist
- Sub-specialties: Forensic psychiatry
- Research: The Depravity Standard, Forensic Peer Review, CIEEO
- Awards: American Psychiatric Association Award of Excellence (1997)
- Website: www.forensicpanel.com

Michael Mark Welner (born September 24, 1964) is an American forensic psychiatrist and chairman of The Forensic Panel.

Welner is known for his work in litigation. He has served as forensic psychiatric examiner in national and international court proceedings. Welner has introduced several approaches in forensic science, forensic psychiatry and justice, including protocols for peer review in forensic medicine consultation, research to standardize an evidence-based distinction of the worst crimes, The Depravity Standard, and recommendations for changes in forensic assessment. He has been featured in news coverage of forensic psychiatry issues, has authored publications for professional and public audiences, and has contributed to emerging legislation on mental health reform.

== Early life and education ==
Welner was born in Pittsburgh, Pennsylvania on September 24, 1964, the youngest of four children. His parents were born in Poland and lost their families in the Holocaust. His father Nick was civil engineer; his mother Barbara, who dropped out of school as refugee during World War II, entered nursing school in Great Britain unable to speak English and finished as valedictorian, going on to specialize in gerontology. Welner's oldest sister, Sandra Welner, was a Maryland-based gynecologist who fought through severe neurological disabilities suffered in a stroke became internationally renowned for her medical research and advocacy for the medical care of the disabled.

Welner graduated high school at the age of 15, and then attended the University of Miami, where he earned a B.S. in biology. He then attended and graduated from the University of Miami School of Medicine. As an undergraduate and medical student at the University of Miami, he announced radio play-by-play for the University of Miami Hurricanes baseball and football teams, which he later credited as his best training for future success as a testifying expert witness.

== Career ==
Welner has maintained a clinical practice since 1992, specializing in patients who have difficulty responding to treatment, and has been Board Certified in Psychiatry, Forensic Psychiatry, Psychopharmacology and Disaster Medicine. He is married to Orli Welner, a corporate attorney.

=== Cases ===
==== State of New York vs. Pedro Hernandez ====
Nearly 40 years after Etan Patz disappeared, Pedro Hernandez was arrested in connection with his kidnapping and murder.

Prosecutors first involved Welner at the early stages after the arrest, before filing charges, to consider defense claims from several psychologists that Hernandez was mentally ill and intellectually disabled and falsely confessed. Welner interviewed Hernandez for sixteen hours, studied confessions he had made many years earlier to a prayer group and to a fiancée, and more recent confessions he made to police interrogators and medical staff Welner concluded that Hernandez confessed because he felt intense guilt and that the spontaneous, voluntary confessions Hernandez made decades earlier to a prayer group and his fiancée couldn't be attributed to a psychiatric condition.

The case proceeded to trial in 2015. Eleven jurors voted guilty, with one holdout juror remaining after nearly three weeks of deliberation. Welner testified for prosecutors at the original trial and then at the retrial, in which a jury unanimously rendered a guilty verdict to Hernandez in early 2017. Among other points, Welner told jurors it was possible Hernandez tried to minimize the damage he'd done even though he confessed. "It is not remarkable at all for a person to recall a sequence of events and to portray it in a way that is as unremarkable as possible, scrubbing away details … (creating a) much more detached relationship between that person and a victim."

==== U.S. vs. Brian David Mitchell ====
Brian David Mitchell, a self-proclaimed prophet, was charged along with his wife in connection with the 2002 kidnapping of Elizabeth Smart. In a case involving the complexities of determining religious zeal from psychosis, Mitchell had been found not competent to stand trial in 2005. Mitchell then began a consistent pattern of singing hymns in court and silence to forensic examiners.

Subsequent evaluations in a state hospital, with which Mitchell did not cooperate, deemed Mitchell to be unchanged – and therefore incompetent. The case was contemplated for dismissal in state court when federal prosecutors asked Welner to study the matter to a definitive end. Welner filed a detailed 206-page report on Mitchell’s competency, highlighting information relevant to the case, and testified to his conclusions that Mitchell was competent. At a 2010 hearing, Justice Dale Kimball ruled Mitchell was competent to proceed.

The case proceeded to trial, where Welner testified that Mitchell was a pedophile, a sadist, personality disordered, and not legally insane. His testimony drew particular attention to cognitive distortions as they differ from delusions, and culture-specific beliefs of fundamentalist LDS adherents. Mitchell was convicted and sentenced to life in prison. The defense waived its right to appeal.

Welner was also the principal mental health consultant to prosecutors of the NXIVM sect leader Keith Raniere, as well as the sect leader Lori Vallow.

==== State vs. Byran Uyesugi ====
Byran Uyesugi, a forty-year-old Xerox service technician, killed seven of his co-workers on November 2, 1999, in Hawaii. Uyesugi began working for Xerox in 1984. He began making unfounded accusations of harassment and product tampering against fellow repairmen. Coworkers told Welner, who interviewed family, friends, neighbors, co-workers, and Uyesugi prior to trial, that as early as 1995, Uyesugi was openly speaking of carrying out a mass shooting at the workplace were he ever to be fired.

After working around his refusal to train on a new machine, Uyesugi's manager insisted on November 1, 1999, that he would begin training the next day. Instead, Uyesugi came to work the next day and shot his colleagues dead, after calmly waiting by the water fountain with "butterflies in his stomach," he later told Welner, as he contemplated the shooting before going through with it.

Uyesugi pleaded not guilty by reason of insanity and claimed that he feared his colleagues were conspiring to have him fired. Welner testified for the prosecution that although Uyesugi was in his opinion a schizophrenic, "He knew what he was doing was wrong, and he simply did not care. The jury found him sane and guilty of seven murders and one attempted murder after only 75 minutes of deliberation. He received a sentence of life without chance of parole. In 2002, the State of Hawaii Supreme Court upheld Uyesugi's conviction.

Welner has consulted to courts or examined perpetrators on mass shooting and attempted mass shooting cases, including Colorado's James Holmes, NBC gunman William Tager, corrections officer George Banks, who killed 13, Tavares Calloway, and bias-hatred mass shooters Richard Baumhammers and Ronald Taylor. He testified before the United States Congress and elsewhere with proposals to eliminate mass homicide as a phenomenon.

==== State of Alabama vs. Harvey Updyke ====
Harvey Updyke, a fanatic of Alabama Crimson Tide football, was charged with poisoning the iconic trees at Auburn University's Toomer's Corner in 2011.

The case reflected on the forensic psychiatric significance of fans' response to emotional defeats, as evidenced by the Auburn defeat of Alabama in November 2010, and the social culture of spectator sports message boards. Welner reviewed the Updyke history and appraise the boundaries of sports fanaticism vs. mental illness, assess his mental state and criminal responsibility. Updyke pleaded guilty prior to trial.

Welner also engaged mental health issues related to the culture of professional sports as the forensic psychiatry examiner in the manslaughter trial of former NBA star Jayson Williams, and the death investigation of wrestling champion Chris Benoit.

==== State of Texas vs. Andrea Yates ====
Andrea Yates was prosecuted by the State of Texas for the murder of her five children. She claimed legal insanity as a defense at trial for the murder of three of her children. In 2002, Yates was convicted of murder, and sentenced her to life imprisonment. In 2005, the conviction was overturned because the prosecution witness, Park Dietz, falsely testified that Yates' behavior and defense was identical to an earlier episode of Law & Order. In anticipation of the 2006 retrial for the drowning of her five children, Welner was asked to assess her diagnosis and Yates' appreciation of the wrong of killing her children at the time of the crime, the criteria for legal insanity. In the videotaped interview with Welner, Yates admitted that she had actually determined to kill the children two months earlier and at a time of relative stability, and was waiting for her first occasion to be alone with them. She knew she would otherwise be stopped. Welner diagnosed Yates with psychotic depression, but concluded that she elected to kill her children because she was overwhelmed, timed with the departure of her mother-in-law that left her as sole caregiver of her five children. Welner also discovered that Andrea Yates locked up the family dog, which was usually free to run around in the house, before drowning the children. Welner included this as one of 68 examples of Yates' appreciation of the wrong of killing her children at the time it happened.

Welner has been the principal examiner in other insanity defense cases and cases, involving child killing within the family, including John Alan Rubio.

==== State of Louisiana vs. Damon Thibodeaux ====
Damon Thibodeaux confessed in 1996 to raping and murdering a cousin, Crystal Champagne. He was tried, convicted, and sentenced to death. District Attorney Paul Connick asked Welner to review the available evidence, the circumstances of the interrogation and the setting in which it occurred, as well as Thibodeaux' vulnerabilities, to inform their decision-making about the case. Welner also conducted a videotaped interview of Thibodeaux, in a case that featured considerable cooperation by prosecution and defense with his protocol. According to Welner, the confession was false because physical findings contradicted Thibodeaux' statements. He issued a 53-page opinion addressing the causes and factors leading to the false confession. These included the defendant's profound guilt over the fate of his cousin, being confronted with his failed polygraph, and police convincing him that what Thibodeaux himself conceded were false statements in the interrogation clinched his guilt and made continuing denials hopeless. Following Welner's conclusions, the District Attorney moved to vacate the confession and Thibodeaux was released. The murder of Crystal Champagne remains under investigation.

Welner has examined other cited disputed confession cases in North American courts, including the killer of New York Socialite Linda Stein and the Albuquerque murder investigation of Victoria Martens.

==== State of Kansas vs. Cheever ====
Scott Cheever was arrested for the shooting death of Sheriff Matthew Samuels at a rural methamphetamine lab. When defense attorneys raised the prospect of a psychiatric defense, federal prosecutors retained Welner to examine criminal responsibility claims, ranging from psychiatric diagnoses to the effects of methamphetamine. Welner's review of the case included a videotaped interview of the defendant, in which they discussed the events of the crime, his movements before and during the shooting of Samuels, and what was influencing his decisions.

Cheever was convicted and eventually sentenced to death.

The Kansas Supreme Court reversed the verdict, and ruled that the trial court erred in permitting prosecutors to call Welner as a witness because an intoxication defense was not a mental health defense. In the court's opinion, the error required a new trial because Welner's testimony included a detailed accounting of Cheever's actions in his own words, and was, "extensive and devastating." In a rare outcome, The United States Supreme Court then unanimously reversed the Kansas Supreme Court, ruling that an intoxication defense, when raised by a defendant, waived a Fifth Amendment protection, that prosecutors had a right to call Welner in rebuttal, and reinstated the verdict and death sentence.

==== U.S. vs. Omar Khadr ====
Khadr, a fifteen-year-old Canadian expatriate living in Afghanistan, was charged with the killing of U.S. Army medic Christopher Speer at an al-Qaeda safe house in Khost. Khadr was captured by American forces on July 27, 2002, and held first in Bagram, Afghanistan and then at Guantanamo Bay detention camp. He was prosecuted through a U.S. military tribunal.

The Department of Defense engaged Welner to examine claims by Khadr that his confessions were coerced, or alternatively, that he was too immature to withstand interrogation. Welner reviewed the available interrogations and secured access to intelligence sources and Khadr's classified file. He interviewed guards, interrogators, medical personnel, Guantanamo camp commanders, intelligence data analysts, and then, Khadr himself. According to Welner Khadr's confessions were the product of his being confronted with later-recovered video of his assembling bombs, and video of his asserting that he wanted to kill many Americans. Welner's inquiry also led him to repudiate defense claims that Khadr had been tortured.

Military prosecutors also asked Welner to assess Khadr's likelihood of recidivism into radical jihadism upon release, for presentation at a sentencing hearing. Welner based his assessment on clinical data, research on deradicalization programs, research on incarcerated Muslim youth, and statistics of recidivism of Guantanamo detainees. At the sentencing proceeding, Welner testified that Khadr was a high risk of recidivism into activities providing support for jihadist terrorism, although he did not expect him to be directly violent. Factors contributing to Welner's opinion included Khadr's continued strong enmeshment with his jihadist family and its legacy, the international and financial infrastructure available to him, his stature among other detainees, among other factors. Referencing Mr. Khadr's evolution at Guantanamo, Welner's testimony noted that then 24-year-old Khadr had been "marinating in jihad," and how the deputy camp commander characterized him as a "rock star" to other inmates who engaged him to lead them.

Welner has consulted to the United States government on other terrorism cases as well, including the accused planners of 9-11 and the alleged mastermind of the USS Cole Bombing.

=== The Forensic Panel ===
Welner is the founder and chairman of The Forensic Panel, a forensic practice which incorporates a structured peer-review process into its consultations. This peer-review approach, as established by The Forensic Panel, is designed to provide an additional layer of scrutiny by having practitioners evaluate forensic assessments for alignment with professional standards. The Forensic Panel includes over thirty professionals who offer consultation in fields such as psychiatry, psychology, neuroradiology, emergency and critical care medicine, nursing, toxicology, and pathology.

=== Research ===
Welner has researched an evidence-based approach for courts and juries tasked with defining "heinous," "depraved," and "evil" crimes in sentencing determinations. The Depravity Standard outlines twenty-five components of intent, actions, victimology, and attitudes associated with criminal offenses. This research emphasizes the importance of gathering objective evidence rather than relying on impressionistic arguments, aiming to establish a methodology that minimizes bias related to race, diagnosis, prognosis, socioeconomics, or other personal factors. The application of the Depravity Standard distinguishes particular crimes by their severity relative to other comparable crimes. For example, the Depravity Standard's application will enable the distinction of the worst of murder relative to other murders, the worst of assault relative to other assaults, and the worst of white collar crimes and thefts relative to comparable crimes.

The Depravity Standard is an inventory of evidence concerning to the different stages of a crime – before, during, and after. The Depravity Scale, an internet-based series of surveys and a component of the Depravity Standard research, has established public consensus for what aspects of a crime are most heinous. The Depravity Standard, informed in part by this data, by higher court decisions, and by evidence from adjudicated cases, is not a psychological evaluation or test. Rather, it is an inventory to guide inexperienced jurors on what qualities of a crime may distinguish its severity if they believe them to be present.

Welner's research has also led to the development of the Clinical Inventory of the Everyday Extreme and Outrageous (CIEEO), a 14-item inventory of non-criminal everyday evil reflecting a range of an actor's intent and effects on a victim. Unlike the Depravity Standard, the CIEEO is intended for clinical and screening contexts to highlight behaviors that warrant treatment or other intervention in order to prevent consequences at home, workplace, or community. The CIEEO is inspired by the goals of vigilance for child abuse – namely, detection and identification being the first step toward intervention and treatment of the worst of behaviors.

Welner researched and developed the typology for classifying drug-facilitated sex assaulters. Such offenders are distinguished by setting, be it workplace, in social interactions, or doctors. The offenders found in each of these separate settings exhibit particular qualities.

=== Public policy ===
Welner was a contributor in a range of proposals within landmark mental health reform legislation that passed the United States Congress in 2016. He testified to lawmakers on multiple occasions prior to the bill's eventual passage. Apart from advocating various ideas to expand crisis mental health services and to attract talent to treat the underserved, Welner also argued for the reform of commitment law, and reform of HIPAA, as a means to prevent both suicide and homicide outcomes. Welner was under consideration by the Trump Administration as Assistant Secretary of Mental Health in the Department of Health and Human Services, a position created to direct mental health and substance abuse policy in the United States.

Among his writings, Welner had long advocated for change in the integrity of forensic mental health through the videotaping of forensic psychiatry interviews, transparent exchange of notes, and peer review. His efforts to mandate videotaping of forensic mental health interviews resulted in laws passed in Illinois and Colorado.

In 1992 and 1993, Welner was a media coordinator and spokesperson for the Ross Perot presidential election campaign in New York and the citizen action organization United We Stand America, also in New York. During the 1992 election campaign, Welner debated in support of Perot against other candidates' representatives.

=== Media ===
Welner has been a contributor to network news programs. He was a forensic science consultant to ABC News' Law and Justice unit, and familiar to many viewers in particular of Good Morning America and 20/20. He has otherwise been a regular contributor to CNN, Fox News, Larry King Live, Bill Bennett's Morning in America, and the Dr. Oz Show, on issues relating to forensic psychiatry and forensic science.

== Selected bibliography ==
- The Depravity Standard I: An Introduction" Welner M, O' Malley K, Gonidakis J, Tellalian R, Journal of Criminal Justice 55C March–April 2018 pp. 1–11
- The Depravity Standard II: Developing a Measure of the Worst of Crimes" Welner M, O' Malley K, Gonidakis J, Saxena A, Burnes J Journal of Criminal Justice March–April 2018 55C (2018) pp. 25–34
- The Depravity Standard III: Validating an Evidence-based Guide" Welner M, O' Malley K, Gonidakis J, Saxena A, Stewart J Journal of Criminal Justice March–April 2018 55C (2018) pp. 12–24
- Peer-Reviewed Forensic Consultation: Safeguarding Expert Testimony and Protecting the Uninformed Court. Welner M., Mastellon T, Stewart J, Weinert B, Stratton J. Jl Forensic Psychology Practice. (in print)
- Disaster Psychiatry. Welner M, Page J In: Disaster Preparedness for Health Care Facilities Canadian Centre of Excellence in Emergency Preparedness
- Mob Violence: A Forensic Psychiatric Perspective on Justice and Prevention. Welner M Empire State Prosecutor Fall 2011 pp 12–16
- Psychotropic Medications and Crime. Welner M., Lubit R, & Stewart J. In: Mozayani A, Raymon L (ed) Handbook of Drug Interactions: A Clinical and Forensic Guide. Humana London. 2011 pp 791–807
- Antipsychotics Drugs and Interactions: Implications for Criminal and Civil Forensics. (book chapter) Welner, M. Opler L. In: Mozayani A, Raymon L (ed) Handbook of Drug Interactions: A Clinical and Forensic Guide. Humana London. 2011 pp 229–259
- Classifying Crimes by Severity: From Aggravators to Depravity, Welner M. In: Douglass J, Ressler R, Burgess A, FBI Crime Classification Manual. Jossey-Bass 2007 pp 55–72.
- Psychopathy, Media, and the Psychology at the Root of Terrorism Welner, M. In: Biological and Chemical Warfare Lawyers and Judges Publishing Tucson Az. 2004 pp 385–421.
- Motives in Crime. Welner, M. In: Dominick J et al. Crime Scene Investigation Elwin Street London. 2004 pp 126–135.
- The Perpetrators and Their Modus Operandi. Welner, M. In: LeBeau M, Mozayani A (ed) Drug Facilitated Sexual Assault. Academic Press. London. 2001 pp 39–74.
