= Welner table =

The Welner table is a medical examination table designed to facilitate accessibility for both patients and doctors with physical disabilities. It was designed by American obstetrician-gynecologist and disability rights activist Sandra Welner.

Welner's work with disabled women patients led her to invent the Welner table, a universally accessible examination table with a wider than usual range of adjustments in position and height, down to as low as 20 inches (510 mm) above floor level for easier transfers from a wheelchair. The table also serves the needs of disabled physicians by allowing a wider range of positions for performing examinations.
