= World Association for Sexual Health =

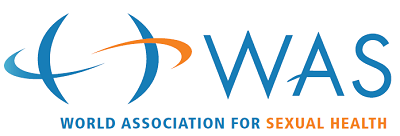
WAS logo

The World Association for Sexual Health (WAS) is an international umbrella organization representing sexological societies and sexologists worldwide. Founded in 1978 in Rome, Italy, the WAS main goal is to promote sexual health for all through sexological science. Since its beginning, the WAS has successfully sponsored 19 international congresses, the last one being held in Gothenburg, Sweden, from June 21 to June 25, 2009. The WAS was previously named World Association for Sexology, but changed its name in order to stress that sexology is a tool for achieving sexual health.

== Member societies ==
Five prominent Regional Continental Federations are members of the WAS: The Asia and Oceania Federation of Sexology (AOFS), the European Federation of Sexology (EFS), the Latin American Federation of Sexology and Sexual Education (FLASSES), the North American Federation of Sexuality Organizations (NAFSO), and the African Federation for Sexual Health and Rights (AFSHR).

WAS members also include more than 100 national and international sexological organizations, institutes and foundations. Among the sexological societies belonging to WAS, we can find: the International Academy of Sex Research, the Sexuality Information and Education Council of the United States (SIECUS), the Society for the Scientific Study of Sexuality (SSSS), the Society for the Advancement of Sexual Health, South Asia Institute for Human Sexuality (SAIHS), the American Association of Sex Educators, Counselors, & Therapists (AASECT) and the World Professional Association for Transgender Health (WPATH).

== World Sexual Health Day ==
In 2010, the WAS instituted September 4 as the World Sexual Health Day in an effort to increase social awareness about the role that sexuality plays in human health, and to promote the fact that sexual health is only attainable through sexual rights.

The theme of the 2010 World Sexual Health Day was "Let's talk about it... an intergenerational discussion", thus, activities around the world had the objective of creating dialogue between youth and adults about sexual health.

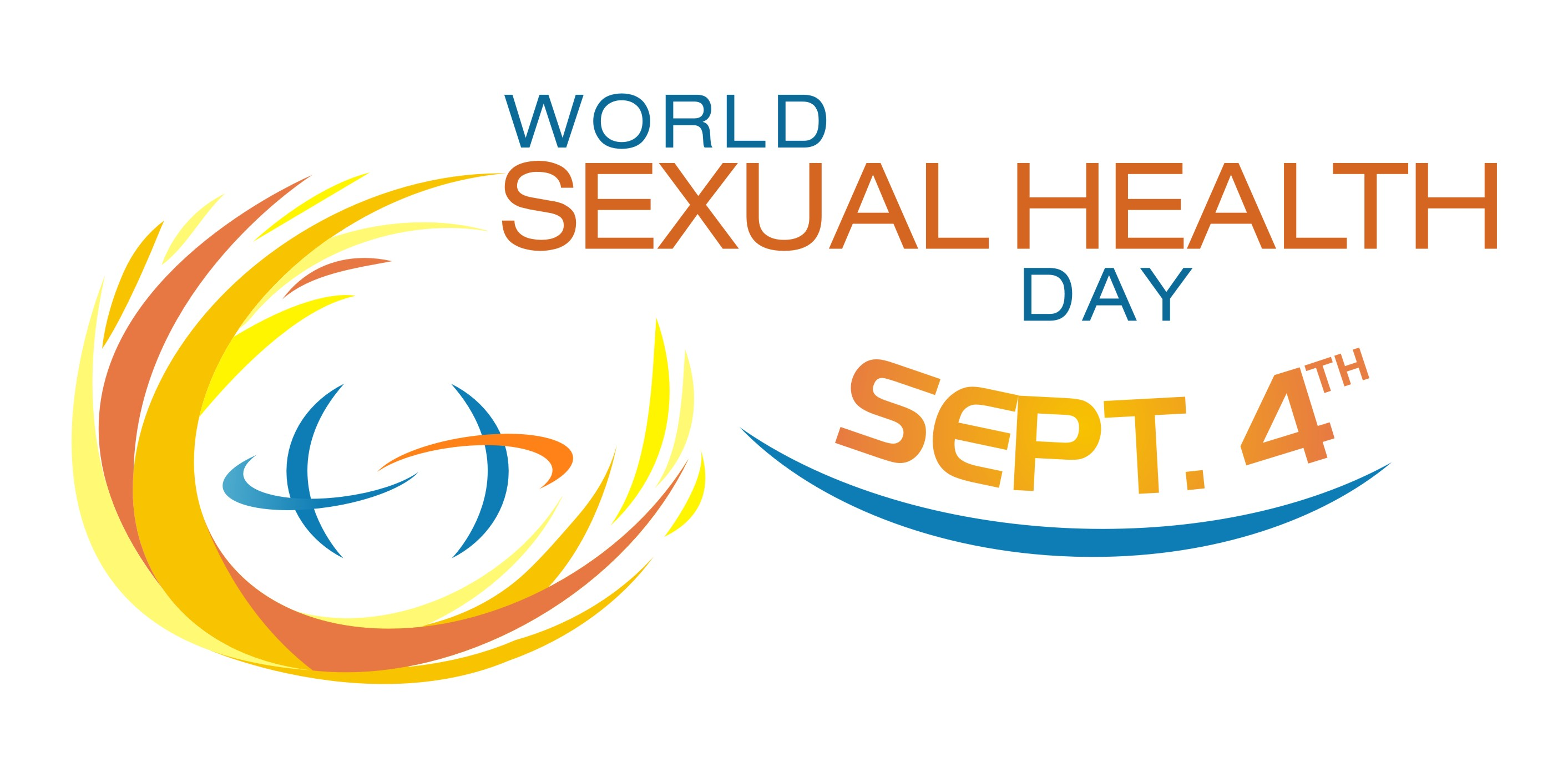
WSHD logo

More than 25 countries joined the celebration, among them: Mexico, Venezuela, Colombia, Argentina, Puerto Rico, Sweden, Japan, Italy, Spain, Austria, etc.

The second World Sexual Health Day took place on September 4, 2011, with the theme "Youth's sexual health: Shared rights and responsibilities" in order to celebrate the beginning of the WAS Youth Initiative and the ending of the International Year of Youth.

And the third one took place on September 4 (also throughout the month of September) with the theme of "Celebrating diversity". More than 40 countries participated.

== Declarations ==
=== Declaration of Sexual Rights ===
The Declaration of Sexual Rights was first proclaimed on the 13th World Congress of Sexology in Valencia 1997 and revised at the 14th World Congress of Sexology in Hong Kong 1999. The current version is from 2014.

This Declaration gave an influence on The Yogyakarta Principles, especially on the idea of each person's integrity, right to issues of sexuality, including the whole spectrum of sexual and reproductive health and rights.

=== Declaration on Sexual Pleasure ===
The Declaration on Sexual Pleasure is a statement on sexual pleasure proclaimed by WAS in 2019. It was declared, in part, in reference to research that asserts sexual pleasure is an element necessary to healthy sexuality.

== Work with the Pan American Health Organization ==
The Pan American Health Organization (an office of the World Health Organization) convened a Regional Consultation on sexual health in collaboration with WAS in Antigua Guatemala, Guatemala in May 2000. The consultation resulted in a document entitled: Promotion for Sexual Health. Recommendations for Action, in which a conceptual framework for the promotion of sexual health is developed.

== Youth initiative ==
The WAS established its youth initiative in an effort to contribute to youth's sexual health and sexual rights through a fuller participation of Youth in WAS governance, policies and activities. The WAS Youth Initiative was proposed and developed by a 22-year-old Mexican sexual health advocate and sexologist, Antón Castellanos Usigli, mentored by Esther Corona, WAS Executive Coordinator, making it an International Youth Initiative conceived by a young mind.

The WAS Youth Initiative Committee, was initially co-chaired by Antón Castellanos Usigli and Esther Corona, and composed of ten members belonging to Venezuela, Lebanon, Cuba, Chile, Sweden, Italy, Kenya, Australia and India is the organ within WAS that develops the Initiative. The Second World Sexual Health Day, which took place on September 4, 2011, celebrated young people's sexual health and rights because of the WAS Youth Initiative and the International Year of Youth. In 2020 the Chair of the committee is Stefano Eleuteri.

== Journal ==
The official journal of the World Association for Sexual Health is the International Journal of Sexual Health, is a peer-reviewed academic journal that covers research on sexual health as a state of physical, emotional, mental, and social well-being.

== See also ==
- Declaration of Sexual Rights
