= Chirakkadavu Sree Mahadeva Temple =

- ചിറക്കടവ് ശ്രീ മഹാദേവ ക്ഷേത്രം
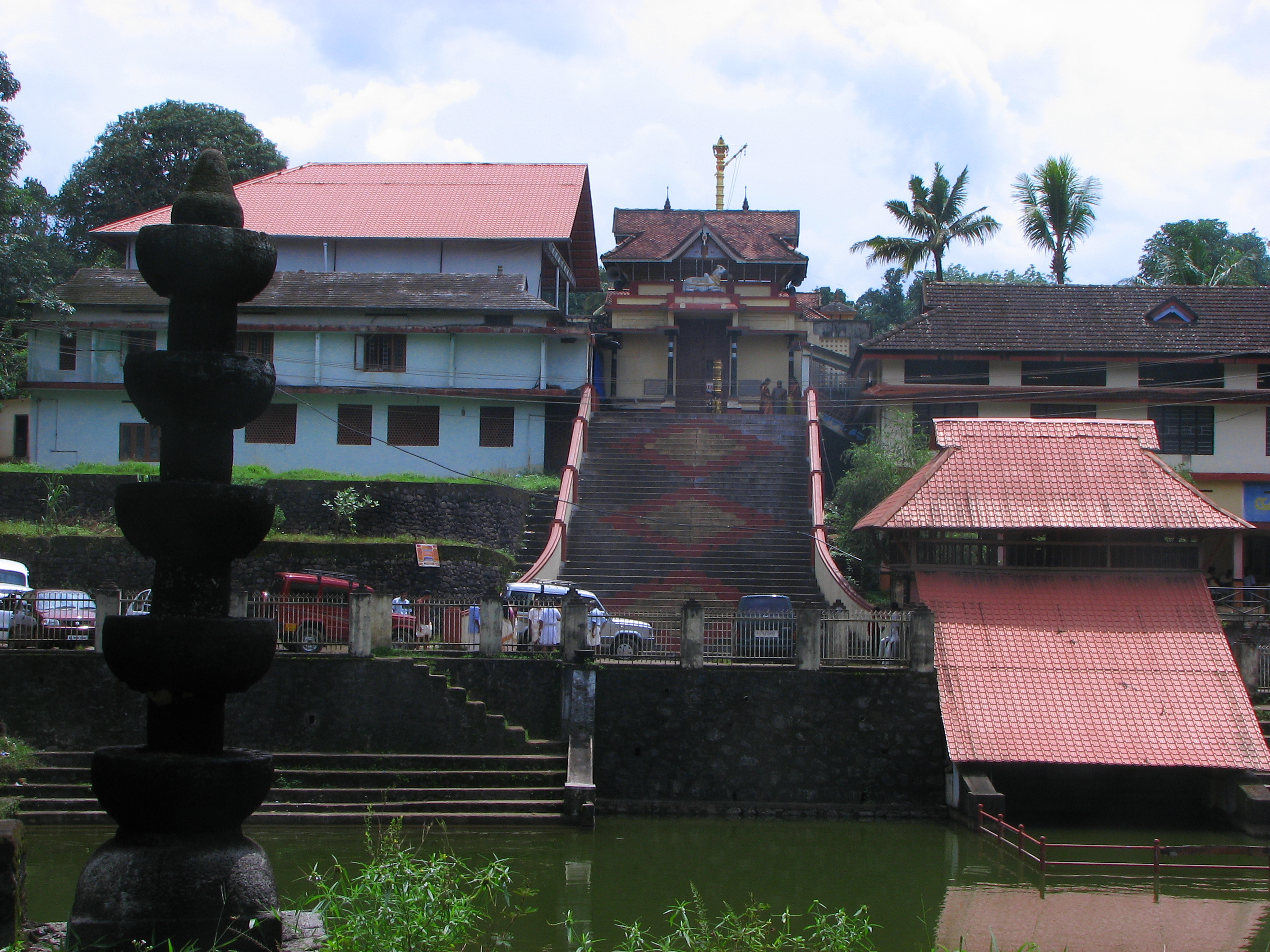
- View of Chirakkadavu temple

- Sree Mahadeva Temple, Chirakkadavu, Kottayam, Kerala

Religion
- Affiliation: Hinduism
- District: Kottayam
- Deity: Shiva
- Festival: Thiru ulsavam

Location
- Location: Chirakkadavu
- State: Kerala
- Country: India
- Coordinates: 9°32′40.9″N 76°45′54.7″E

Architecture
- Type: Traditional Kerala style

Specifications
- Temple: One
- Elevation: 74.15 m (243 ft)

Chirakkadavu Mahadevar Temple is a Hindu temple at Chirakkadavu in Kottayam, Kerala, India. It was built in the medieval period and the idol is a lingam (phallic icon) of Shiva.

== See also ==
- Temples of Kerala
