= Peruvemba =

- village
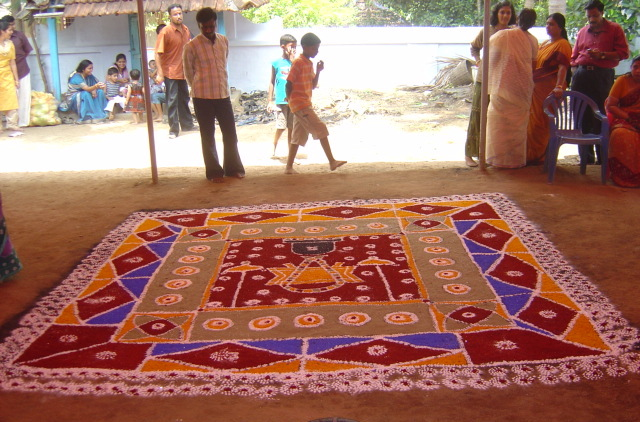
- Andayil Temple, Peruvemba
- Interactive map of Peruvemba
- Coordinates: 10°41′55″N 76°41′15″E
- Country: India
- State: Kerala
- District: Palakkad

Population (2011)
  - Total: 19,312

Languages
  - Official: Malayalam, English
- Time zone: UTC+5:30 (IST)
- Postal code: 678531
- Vehicle registration: KL- 9
- Nearest city: Palakkad
- Lok Sabha constituency: Alathur

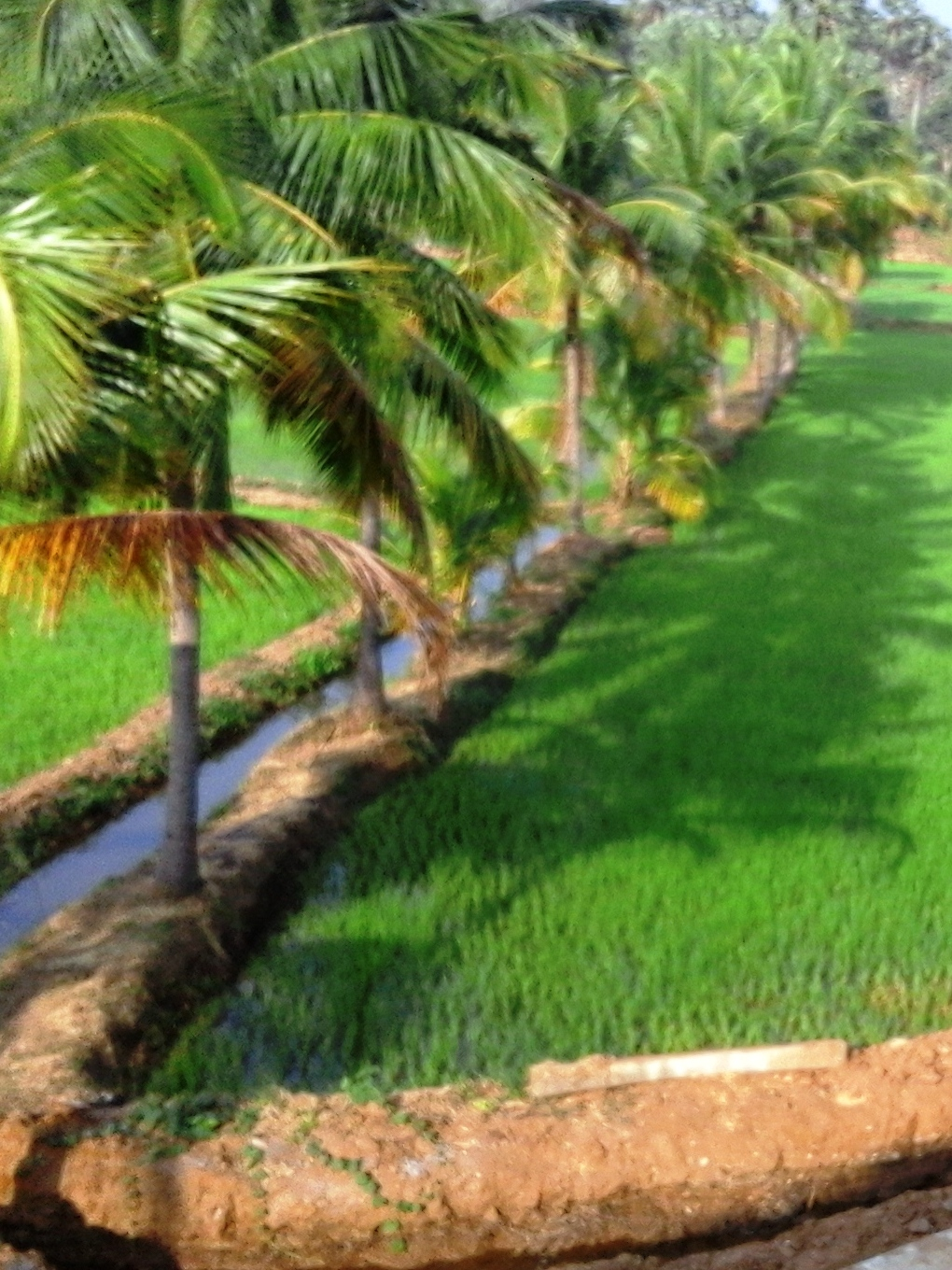
Pudunagaram

Peruvemba is a village and gram panchayat near Chittur-Thathamangalam in the Palakkad district of Kerala, India. Within the village is the Ootukulangara Bhagavathy Temple.

Peruvemba is famous for the uniquely skilled craftsmen who manufacture and tune the leather-based percussion musical instruments such as Mridangam, Maddalam, Tabla, Timila, Chenda, Idakka etc. These families have been in this craft for about 200 years. Today, about 74 families in and around Peruvemba are continuing this tradition. Renowned musicians from different parts of the country visit Peruvemba for purchasing and maintenance of the instruments.

== Demographics ==
As of 2011 India census, Peruvemba had a population of 19,312 with 9,471 males and 9,841 females.
