= Ootukulangara Bhagavathy Temple, Peruvemba =

Coordinates: 10.7066°N 76.6917°E

Oottukalangara Bhagavathy Temple

Religion
- Affiliation: Hinduism
- District: Palakkad

Location
- Location: Peruvemba
- State: Kerala
- Country: India
- Interactive map of Oottukalangara Bhagavathy Temple

Specifications
- Temple: 1
- Monument: 1

Website
- https://sreeoottukulangarabhagavathidevaswom.com

Oottukulangara Bhagavathy temple is the Hindu temple situated in Peruvemba village of Palakkad district in the state of Kerala.

The primary deity of the temple is Sri Ootukulangara Bhagavathy along with Lord Ganapathy and Lord Ayyappan. The temple timings are from 5 AM to 10.30 AM and 5 PM to 7 PM. Main offerings for the Ootukulangara Bhagavathy are Chanthatam, Kadumadura Payasam, Villaku, Trikaala pooja and Udayasthamana Pooja along with various other offerings. Chanthatam can be performed only in the morning pooja section of the temple.

== Temple Legend ==
The temple is situated where there was once a paddy field. Legend has it that a farm worker plowing the field heard a sound of his plow hitting metal, releasing a flow of blood. He ran away and narrated the incident to the landlord. The Landlord inspected the place, was convinced of the peasant's story, and brought in an astrologer. After conducting the prasanam, the astrologer concluded that the idol was the swaymbhu idol of the Bagavathy, making the venue extremely sacred. The landlord constructed a temple where the idol was found. The temple sreekovil is roof less and its idol is below the Asoka tree. Older residents say that this Asoka tree remains exactly the same size as it was in their own childhood.

== Temple Festivals ==
Patham Padhiyam popularly known as Chanthatam is the major temple festival. It normally falls in the last week of December. The festival begins from the Malayalam month of Vrischikam or Mandalamasam. Vilakku (lighting of lamps in the temple and special pooja) is daily performed from the first day of Vrischikam masam to chanthatam festival. The chanthatam is celebrated after 41 Niravilaku in the first following Monday or Thursday. Devotees offer auspicious offering of the Bagavathy ‘chanthatam’ to the Bagavathy at the festival day. The temple is open until 1 PM from the morning at the Chanthatam day.

Navaratri festival is also auspicious in the temple. Vilakku is daily performed in the nine days of navarathri.

Peruvemba Vela is another festival of the Ootukulangara Bagavathy. It is not performed in the temple; it is performed in the Thoovaseri Mannam, which is the moolasdanam of the Bagavathy.

== Temple Location and Contacts ==
Oottukulangara Bhagavathy temple is situated 1.4 km (0.87 mi) from Peruvemba junction. Peruvemba village is 11 km (6.8 mi) from Palakkad town. The temple is 17 km (11 mi) away from Palakkad junction railway station. Nearest airport is Coimbatore International Airport.

The temple's street address is Sree Oottukulangara Bhagavathy Temple, Peruvemba (PO), Palakaad, Kerala-678531.
