= Chirakkadavu =

- village
- Location in Kerala, India Chirakkadavu (India)
- Coordinates: 9°31′0″N 76°47′0″E
- Country: India
- State: Kerala
- District: Kottayam

Population (2011)
  - Total: 29,717

Languages
  - Official: Malayalam, English
- Time zone: UTC+5:30 (IST)
- Vehicle registration: KL-34

Chirakkadavu is a village in Kottayam district in the state of Kerala, India. The nearest town of Chirakkadavu is Kanjirappally. The main landmark of the place is Sree Mahadeva Temple. It is one of the temples included in 108 Siva Temples. Chirakkadavu East - Mannamplavu junction. There is also a Hindu temple viz., Manakkattu Sree Bhadra Temple in Chirakkadavu.

== Demographics ==
As of 2011 India census, Chirakkadavu had a population of 29,717 with 14,430 males and 15,287 females.

== See also ==
- Kanjirappally
