= Thichur =

Thichoor Thichur
- village
- Location in Kerala, India Thichoor (India)
- Coordinates: 10°43′0″N 76°11′0″E
- Country: India
- State: Kerala
- District: Thrissur

Languages
  - Official: Malayalam, English
- Time zone: UTC+5:30 (IST)
- Postal code: 680584
- Vehicle registration: KL-

Thichoor is a village in Thrissur district some 30 km (19 mi) north of Thrissur town.
