= Maddala Keli =

Genre in Carnatic music, featuring a set of maddalam drums as the main instrument

In Carnatic music, Maddala Keli or Maddalapattu is a musical genre featuring a set of maddalam drums as the main instrument – not chenda drums – with support from a row of ilathalam. A Maddala Keli work with five maddalam players is called Panchamaddalakeli; with ten players, Dashamaddalakeli. It sticks mainly to an eight-beat rhythmic cycle called Chembada or adi talam. It also has a segment called Kooru, where rhythmic cycles can be the six-beat panchari (pancharikkooru), the 14-beat adantha (adantha-kkooru) and the ten-beat chamba (chambakkooru). Scholars say the ensemble of thayambaka was developed from maddala keli.

== See also ==
- Pandi Melam
- Panchari melam
- Panchavadyam
- Kathakali
