= Sexual and reproductive health and rights =

Concept in human rights

Sexual and reproductive health and rights or SRHR is the concept of human rights applied to sexuality and reproduction. It is the recognition of every person’s right to make fully informed and self-determined decisions about their sexual participation, such as contraception use, sexual partners, and access to sexual health information and services, without discrimination, violence, and/or coercion. SRHR encompasses a combination of four distinct yet interconnected fields, which may exhibit varying degrees of distinction depending on the specific context. These four fields include sexual health, sexual rights, reproductive health and reproductive rights. In the broad concept of SRHR, these four fields are treated as separate, but are inherently intertwined.

Distinctions between these four fields are not always made. Sexual health and reproductive health are sometimes treated as synonymous to each other, as are sexual rights and reproductive rights. In some cases, sexual rights are included in the term sexual health, or vice versa. Not only do different non-governmental organisations (NGOs) and governments organisations use different terminologies, but different terminologies are often used within the same organization.

Some of the notable global NGOs that fight for sexual and reproductive health and rights include IPPF (International Planned Parenthood Federation), ILGA (International Lesbian and Gay Alliance), WAS (World Association for Sexual Health - formerly known as World Association for Sexology), the Center for Health and Gender Equity, and International HIV/AIDS Alliance.

== History ==
Government-run family planning programs first began in the 1950s. However, the main objectives of these programs were often centered around population control for economic growth and development. In 1994, the International Conference on Population and Development (ICPD) in Cairo, Egypt marked a significant shift in perspective in regards to reproductive health and is considered to be the birth of the modern SRHR movement. Over the course of the conference, debates surrounding family planning shifted from that of economics to that of public health and human rights. A Program of Action (PoA) was developed by the end of the ICPD and was approved and adopted by 179 countries. The PoA affirmed sexual and reproductive health as a universal human right and outlined global goals and objectives for improving reproductive heath based around central themes of free choice, women's empowerment, and viewing sexual and reproductive health in terms of physical and emotional well-being. The PoA outlined a series of goals, based on a central mission of achieving universal access to reproductive health worldwide, that were aimed to be accomplished by 2015. In 2000, the Millennium Development Goals (MDGs) were developed, and although reproductive health was not explicitly stated as one of the goals, it became an important component to Goals 3, 4, and 5. In 2010, the original PoA was revisited by the United Nations and updated to reflect their objective of achieving universal reproductive health care by 2015. When the MDGs and ICPD PoA phased out in 2015, the next objectives for SRHR were folded into the Sustainable Development Goals, the next iteration of the MDGs which outline objectives to combat poverty through 2030. One of these goals, specifically SDG 5.6, is set to “ensure universal access to sexual and reproductive health and reproductive rights” which includes “informed decisions” in relation to SRHR (SDGs UN 2015). The UN is working to provide access to contraception globally and has made it an essential part of its work on SRHR. This provides the framework for countries to enact SRHR policies and allows for work to be made in an effort to reach individual autonomy within the population (autonomy referring to the ability of a woman to make decisions about herself as a basic human right).

== Bodily Autonomy ==
Bodily autonomy is a fundamental human right, yet it is unevenly protected across global policies on sexual and reproductive health and rights (SRHR). Two notable examples, Female Genital Mutilation (FGM) and abortion, reveal the contradiction in how this right is upheld. While FGM is widely condemned as a harmful traditional practice and a violation of girls’ rights, abortion remains a deeply contested issue, often restricted or stigmatized despite also involving questions of autonomy, health, and dignity. This inconsistency is especially clear in the way international organizations and donor governments allocate funding: efforts to end FGM receive broad support, while access to safe abortion is frequently underfunded, politicized, or undermined through policies like the Global Gag Rule. This imbalance reflects not a neutral application of human rights principles, but the influence of global power dynamics and cultural politics on the definition and defense of bodily autonomy.

== Sexual health ==
The World Health Organization defines sexual health as: "Sexual health is a state of physical, mental and social well-being in relation to sexuality. It requires a positive and respectful approach to sexuality and sexual relationships, as well as the possibility of having pleasurable and safe sexual experiences, free of coercion, discrimination and violence."

== Sexual rights ==
Unlike the other three aspects of SRHR, the struggle for sexual rights include, and focus on, sexual pleasure and emotional sexual expression. One platform for this struggle is the WAS Declaration of Sexual Rights.

The World Association for Sexual Health (WAS) was founded in 1978 by a multidisciplinary, world-wide group of NGOs to promote the field of sexology.

The Platform for Action from the 1995 Beijing Conference on Women established that human rights include the right of women freely and without coercion, violence or discrimination, to have control over and make decisions concerning their own sexuality, including their own sexual and reproductive health. This paragraph has been interpreted by some countries as the applicable definition of women's sexual rights. The UN Commission on Human Rights has established that if women had more power, their ability to protect themselves against violence would be strengthened.

A significant shift occurred in the Association's history when in 1997, the World Congress of Sexology issued the Valencia Declaration of Sexual Rights. This was a visionary move on the part of María Pérez Conchillo and Juan José Borrás Valls (congress presidents) that shifted WAS to more of an advocacy organization championing sexual rights as fundamental to the promotion of sexual health and the field of sexology. A press conference was held during the Congress to publicize the adoption of the Valencia Declaration and received world-wide attention.

This declaration has had world-wide impact in the recognition of the importance of sexual rights as human rights. Besides the tremendous impact on WHO, our declaration provoked IPPF to issue its own declaration of Sexual Rights in 2008.

Subsequently, WAS made some revisions to the Valencia Declaration and proposed a WAS Declaration of Sexual Rights which was approved by the General Assembly at the 14th World Congress of Sexology (Hong Kong, 1999). The WAS adopted the Declaration of Sexual Rights, which originally included 11 sexual rights. It was heavily revised and expanded in March 2014 by the WAS Advisory Council to include 16 sexual rights:

1. The right to equality and non-discrimination
2. The right to life, liberty and security of the person
3. The right to autonomy and bodily integrity
4. The right to be free from torture and cruel, inhuman, or degrading treatment or punishment
5. The right to be free from all forms of violence and coercion
6. The right to privacy
7. The right to the highest attainable standard of health, including sexual health; with the possibility of pleasurable, satisfying, and safe sexual experiences
8. The right to enjoy the benefits of scientific progress and its application
9. The right to information
10. The right to education and the right to comprehensive sexuality education
11. The right to enter, form, and dissolve marriage and similar types of relationships based on equality and full and free consent
12. The right to decide whether to have children, the number and spacing of children, and to have the information and the means to do so
13. The right to the freedom of thought, opinion, and expression
14. The right to freedom of association and peaceful assembly
15. The right to participation in public and political life
16. The right to access to justice, remedies, and redress

This Declaration influenced The Yogyakarta Principles (which were launched as a set of international principles relating to sexual orientation and gender identity on 26 March 2007), especially on the idea of each person's integrity, and right to sexual and reproductive health.

In 2015, the U.S. government said it would begin using the term "sexual rights" in discussions of human rights and global development.

On 12 July 2024, the first UN resolution that included sexual rights was adopted at the 56th Session of the Human Rights Council(HRC). The HRC resolution “Human rights in the context of HIV and AIDS," calls for member states to develop "sexual and reproductive health services, as well as education programmes on sexual and reproductive health and rights". This is in contrast to previous documents and resolutions by the UN that exclude language around sexual rights.

Sexual rights are also often discussed in the context of armed conflict. Amongst other global entities, the UN Security Council has various attempts to address the issue of gendered issues in conflict and post-conflict situations, including sexual violence.

United Nations Security Council Resolution (UNSCR) 1325, passed in 2000, marked a significant step in recognizing the disproportionate impact of armed conflict on women and the need for their inclusion in peace processes. While not limited to sexual violence, Resolution 1325 calls for systemic change, gender mainstreaming, and women’s involvement in preventing and prosecuting such crimes.

It laid the foundation for more targeted resolutions like UNSCR 1820 (2008), which explicitly classified sexual violence in conflict not only as a human rights violence, but also as a threat to international peace and security, urging stronger preventive and responsive measures.

This effort continued with UNSCR 1888 (2009), which criticized the lack of enforcement of prior resolutions and called for concrete action, including the suggestion of a Special Representative that would lead efforts against sexual violence in conflict. Together, these resolutions frame sexual violence not only as a humanitarian issue but as a systemic and security concern requiring urgent, institutional attention and action.

== Reproductive health ==
Within the framework of the World Health Organization's (WHO) definition of health as a state of complete physical, mental and social well-being, and not merely the absence of disease or infirmity, reproductive health, or sexual health/hygiene, addresses the reproductive processes, functions and system at all stages of life. Reproductive health, therefore, implies that people are able to have a responsible, satisfying and safer sex life and that they have the capability to reproduce and the freedom to decide if, when and how often to do so. One interpretation of this implies that men and women ought to be informed of and to have access to safe, effective, affordable and acceptable methods of birth control; also access to appropriate health care services of sexual, reproductive medicine and implementation of health education programs to stress the importance of women to go safely through pregnancy and childbirth could provide couples with the best chance of having a healthy infant. The health of a mother postpartum is also paramount, and access to safer abortions can be very important. In a BMC Women's Health study done across 162 countries in 2019, those countries with access to legal and safer abortions experienced, on average, 45 fewer maternal deaths per 100,000 live births. On the other hand, individuals do face inequalities in reproductive health services. Inequalities vary based on socioeconomic status, education level, age, ethnicity, religion, and resources available in their environment. It is possible for example, that low income individuals lack the resources for appropriate health services and the knowledge to know what is appropriate for maintaining reproductive health.

== Reproductive rights ==
Reproductive rights are legal rights and freedoms relating to reproduction and reproductive health. The World Health Organization defines reproductive rights as follows:

Reproductive rights rest on the recognition of the basic right of all couples and individuals to decide freely and responsibly the number, spacing and timing of their children and to have the information and means to do so, and the right to attain the highest standard of sexual and reproductive health. They also include the right of all to make decisions concerning reproduction free of discrimination, coercion and violence.

The area of sexual and reproductive rights is influenced by contextual cultural and social norms, socioeconomic factors and existing laws and regulations. The social-structural climate may affect both the access to and quality of sexual and reproductive health care and interventions.

== Goals and objectives ==
Despite frequent changes to frameworks, overall goals for SRHR remain little changed. As first stipulated at the ICPD, universal reproductive health care remains the ultimate objective, and with each new framework, targets are developed to progress towards this. In the original ICPD Program of Action, the primary call was for universal access to healthcare, including reproductive healthcare, family planning and sexual health. Over time, these have expanded to include the right to access education regarding sexual and reproductive health, an end to female genital mutilation, and increased women's empowerment in social, political, and cultural spheres.

Special goals and targets were also created to address adolescent sexual and reproductive health needs. Adolescents are often the most vulnerable to risks associated with sexual activity, including HIV, due to personal and social issues such as feelings of isolation, child marriage, and stigmatization. Governments realized the importance of investing in the health of adolescents as a means of establishing future well-being for their societies. As a result, the Commission on Population and Development developed a series of fundamental rights for adolescents including the right to comprehensive sex education, the right to decide all matters related to their sexuality, and access to sexual and reproductive health services without discrimination (including safe abortions wherever legal).

== See also ==
- Abortion-rights movements
- Disability and sexuality
- Disability and women's health
- Freedom of choice
- LGBT rights by country or territory
- Global Information Society Watch
- Sex workers' rights
- Sex Workers' Rights Movement
