= Examination table =

Raised flat surface on which a patient is placed during a physical examination

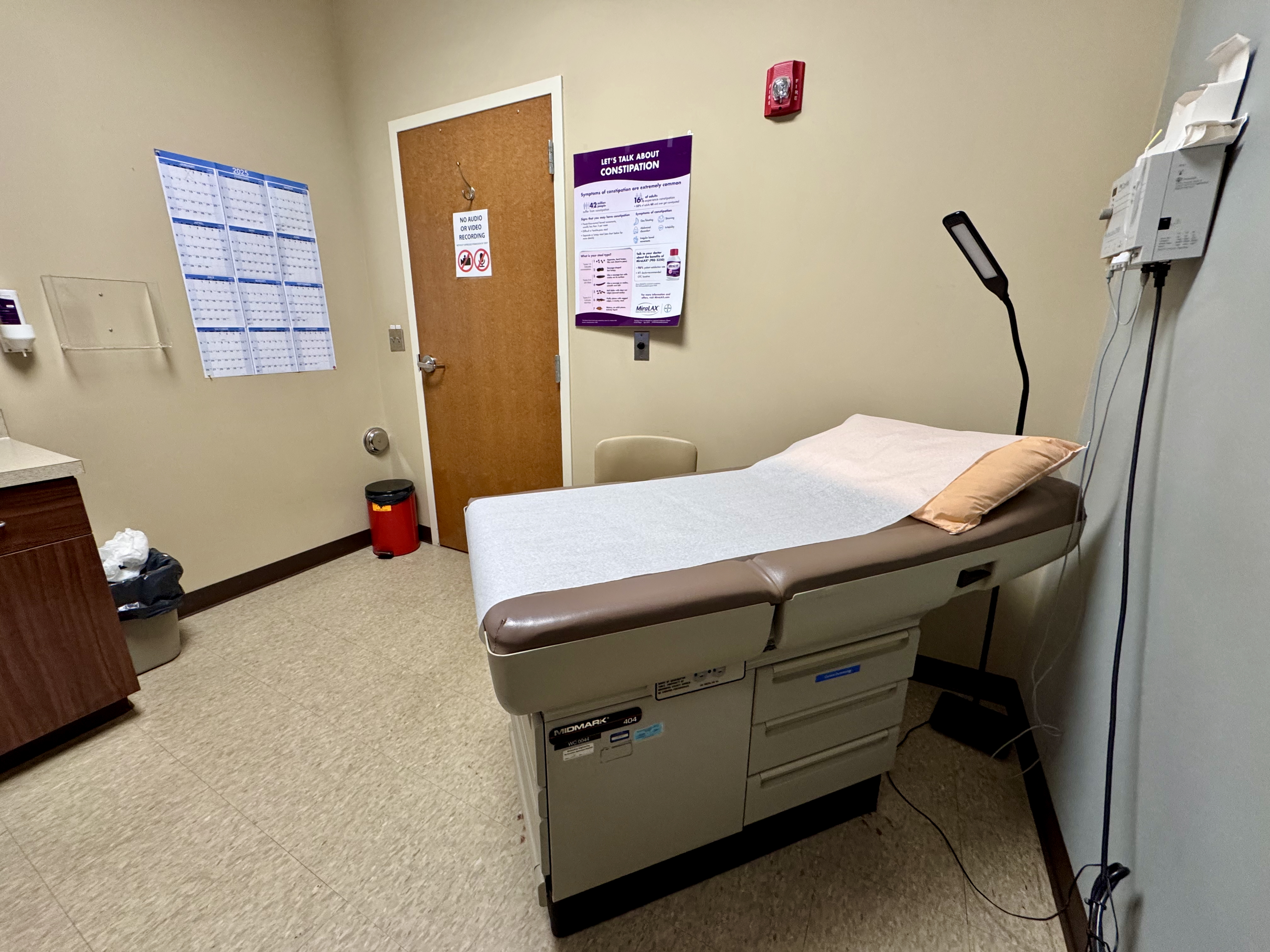
An examination table in a doctor's office

An examination table (or exam table) is a piece of medical furniture used to support patients during physical assessments, minor procedures or imaging-guided interventions. During these exams, doctors in offices (UK: surgeries), clinics and hospitals use an adjusting mechanism to manipulate and position the table to allow patient support, closer examination of a portion or the entire patient, and the ability to move the patient on and off the table safely. Examination tables often have rolls of paper which the patient sits or lies on, to protect the table. The paper is normally discarded after each patient uses the table.

Although purpose-built couches for bloodletting existed in eighteenth-century Europe, the modern examination table emerged in the late nineteenth century after industrial wood-and-steel fabrication made height-adjustable frames affordable for general practice surgeries. Today most Western regulatory regimes classify the table as a Class I medical device, subject to basic safety and labelling requirements, while treating any integrated electrical actuators or heating elements under higher-risk rules.

Examination tables have included electric motors since the 1970s. These are fitted underneath the tabletop and power cables generally detach to prevent a tripping hazard. The ability to transfer power forward and backwards using a reversible electric motor means greater mobility of the examination table. Contemporary designs fall into three broad categories: fixed-height general-practice tables, electric or hydraulic "high–low" models that descend to wheelchair seat level, and specialist variants (for example obstetric–gynaecological tables with retractable leg supports and radiolucent tops used in interventional suites).

Ergonomic studies show that a working height of 810–910 mm (32–36 in) reduces stooping for most practitioners, yet a transfer height below 480 mm (19 in) is essential for patients who use wheelchairs or have limited lower-limb strength. The United States Access Board has established technical criteria specifying that medical diagnostic equipment used in the supine, prone, side-lying, and seated position must have a low transfer height of 17 inches (430 mm), though these standards only become mandatory when adopted and enforced by other agencies. High–low tables achieve the required vertical travel through scissor lifts or columnar actuators powered by foot pedals or low voltage motors, with positional feedback that stops motion if an obstruction is detected. Typical accessories include disposable paper rolls to maintain surface hygiene, drawers for basic instruments, integral scales for bariatric assessment, and detachable stirrups or arm boards; many models also feature manually articulated backrests adjusted to 70–80° to facilitate cardiopulmonary examination without fully upright seating.

Healthcare furniture cleanability guidelines recommend impervious, non-porous upholstery materials such as polyurethane or vinyl that can withstand hospital-grade disinfectants and resist moisture from steam applications, while avoiding seams, crevices, and other areas that trap contaminants. Routine preventive maintenance involves inspecting actuators, brakes and power cables, lubricating moving joints, and replacing damaged padding, tasks usually scheduled annually in primary care and bi-annually in high-throughput outpatient departments. Human-factors reviews emphasise that careful specification of table height range, hand-control layout and patient supports can reduce musculoskeletal injuries among clinicians and improve the dignity and autonomy of patients with mobility impairments.

== See also ==
- Medical facility
- Operating table
- Ambulatory care
