= Gender and disability =

Gender and disability examines the intersection of gender and disability, exploring how social, cultural, and economic factors shape the experiences of individuals with disabilities based on their gender identity. Women and non-binary individuals with disabilities often face compounded discrimination, experiencing both ableism and gender-based inequalities in areas such as healthcare, employment, education, and social participation. The intersectional nature of gender and disability influences access to resources, legal protections, and opportunities, with marginalized groups frequently encountering higher rates of poverty, violence, and exclusion.

Historically, gender norms and stereotypes have shaped perceptions of disability, often reinforcing traditional roles and limiting autonomy. Feminist and disability rights movements have increasingly addressed these issues, advocating for more inclusive policies and practices that recognize the diverse needs of disabled individuals across different gender identities. Research in this field spans disciplines such as sociology, gender studies, disability studies, and public policy, aiming to challenge systemic barriers and promote equality.

== Medical misogyny ==
=== Historical ===
==== Hysteria ====
"Hysteria is undoubtedly the first mental disorder attributable to women, accurately described in the second millennium BC, and until Freud, considered an exclusively female disease." Since Ancient Greek times, the idea that a woman can go mad in a way that effects exclusively women was not an uncommon one, and until Sigmund Freud it was believed that often the reason for this madness was an improper sex life, with Plato arguing that the cure for hysteria was to "join with the male and... give rise to a new birth." Hippocrates wrote that the cause of hysteria was the buildup of putrefied humors which caused various disorders within the body and could only be expunged through regular sexual behavior.

In the Middle Ages, Trota of Salerno approached the idea of hysteria from a different perspective, offering the explanation that "the suffering related to gynecological diseases was "intimate": women often, out of shame, do not reveal their troubles to the doctor." Later, hysteria was a common reason for innocent women to be tried as witches and put to death.

Freud recontextualizes the theory of hysteria, arguing instead that it is related to a dysfunction within the brain and not contained within the uterus, but that it is still a woman's disease, only serving to bring the concept of the "possessed woman" into the modern age.

=== Modern ===
Many disabilities, such as fibromyalgia, are vastly disproportionally diagnosed in female patients compared to male patients even though there is no known medical cause for this gender disparity. However, disorders involving the female reproductive system are often unnoticed, under-diagnosed, or reported to have diagnostic processes involving dissatisfactory amounts of delay or labor on behalf of the patient. These include endometriosis and polyendocrine metabolic ovarian syndrome (PMOS).

Disabilities common to both females and males, especially developmental disabilities, often favor male patients in ease of diagnosis. Studies done on both autism and attention deficit hyperactivity disorder suggest that "masculine defaults" in healthcare influence diagnosticians by creating a mental platonic ideal diagnostic case, which often excludes women who present the same symptoms as men.

==== Interactions with racism ====
Stemming from medical racism, there is a common phenomenon experienced by people of color who seek medical attention where their bodies are believed to be fundamentally different than those of white people by white people who work in medical fields. One such particularly pervasive belief is the idea that "blacks have thicker skin than do white people," which leads to the idea that Black patients have a higher innate pain tolerance than white patients.

Similarly to the seen-above idea of the male default, there exists a parallel white-as-default which influences medical practice. Medical devices such as the pulse oximeter are calibrated to white skin, causing them to read improperly when used on Black patients. Diagnostic tests, such as kidney function screens, read Black patients as having higher risk when tested. Often, medical training itself is oriented around light skin as a standard. These and additional factors, when amplified across an entire anti-Black medical system, end up treating Blackness itself as a chronic condition.

Black patients have described the way their concerns about themselves and their family members are dismissed by the medical profession as gaslighting. For example, ALS, on average, is diagnosed later in Black patients than equivalent white ones, if not missed entirely. Studies have found systematic barriers to breast cancer diagnosis in Black women. Ethnic minority patients diagnosed with fibromyalgia report higher levels of sleep and mood disturbances than white patients.

In following with the concept of misogynoir, Black female patients, explained by intersectional feminism, suffer both from racism and sexism within healthcare and often find that the combination of the two synthesizes into something separate from each on their own. College-educated Black mothers are nearly six times as likely to die from pregnancy-related complications, and as the rate of fatal complications decrease in white patients correlating with education level, it stays nearly the same among Black patients.

Significant parts of the profession of gynaecology are reliant on information that was obtained by using the bodies of Black women as testing equipment, only to dispose of them after the information had been gleaned, often without medical treatment. J. Marion Sims, often referred to with the epithet "Father of Gynecology", was notorious for operating on enslaved women without anesthesia, a practice common among medical professionals at the time.

== In transgender people ==
Transgender patients seeking medical care, especially those on hormone replacement therapy, are often subject to what is known as trans broken arm syndrome, a phenomenon in which "a provider incorrectly assumes that a medical condition results from a patient's gender identity or medical transition."

Transgender people are nearly twice as likely to be disabled when compared to cisgender people. In studies of trans youth, it has been reported that trans people are more likely to have Ehlers–Danlos syndrome and psychosis, among other disabilities.
