= Madhalam =

Unpitched percussion instrument

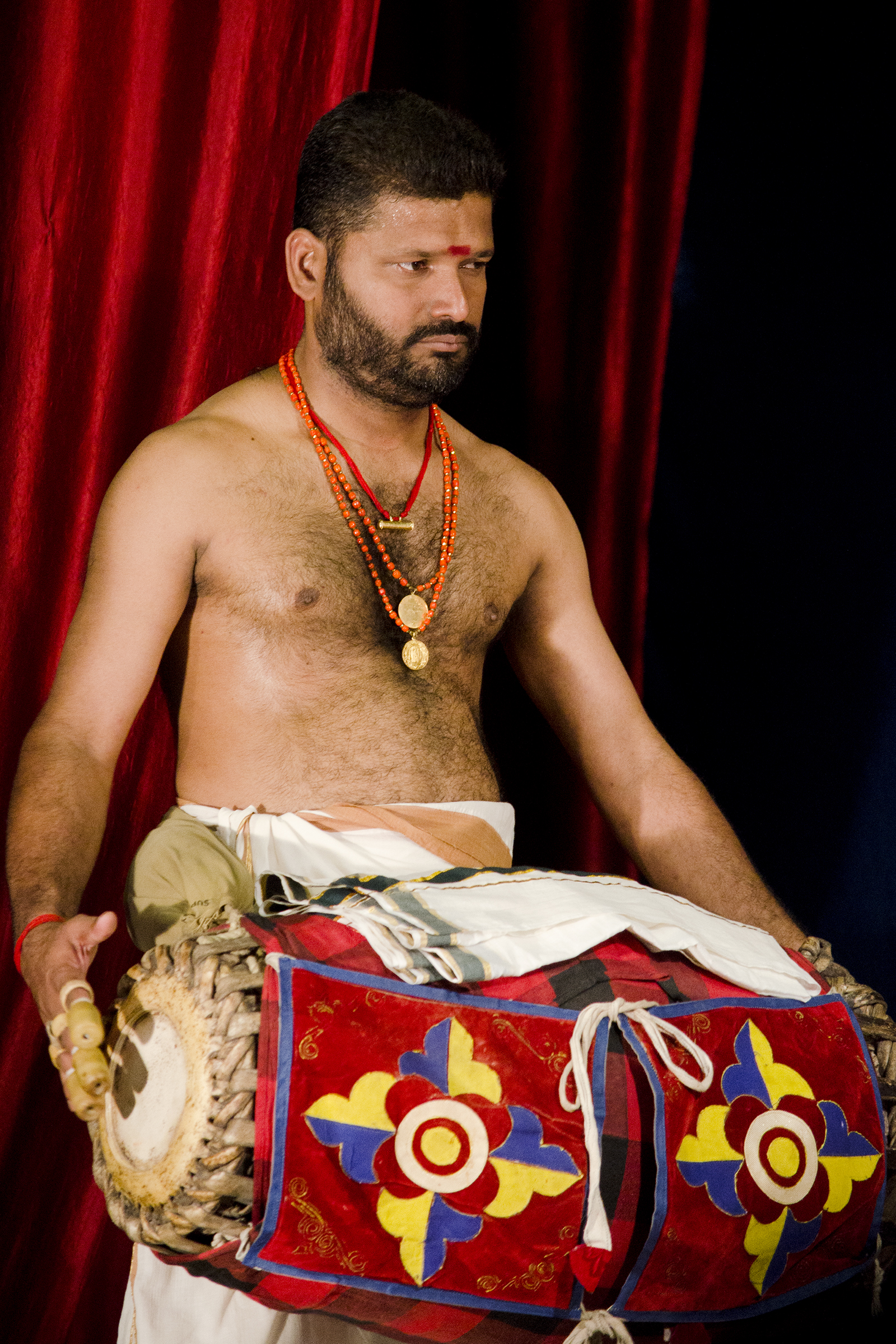
Drummer playing Madhalam

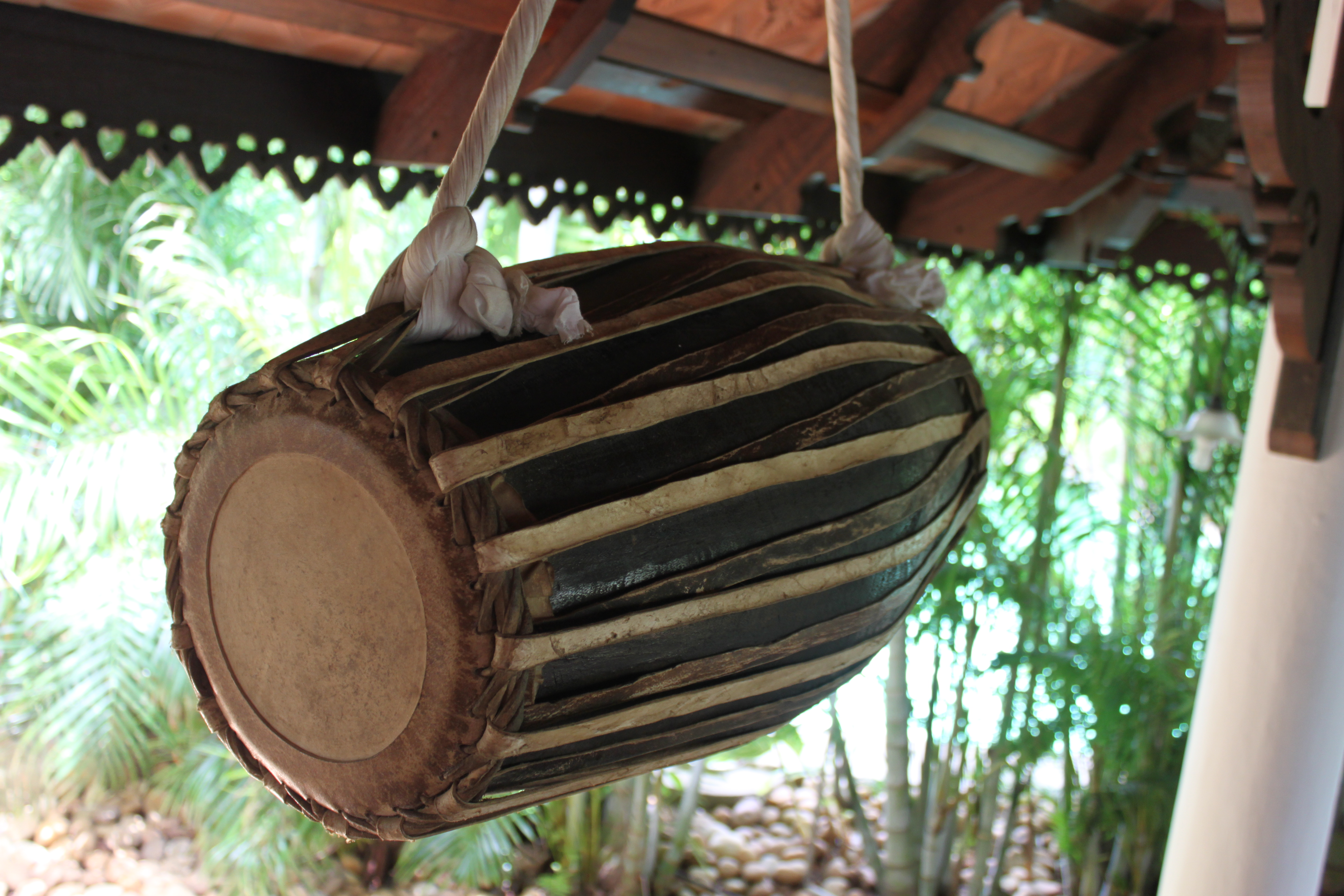
Madhalam

The maddalam, madalam or madhalam (Malayalam: മദ്ദളം) is a drum made out of the wood of the jackfruit tree. It has two sides for playing, made out of leather, and has different kinds of sounds on each side. The maddalam is a heavy instrument that is hung around the waist of the person playing, and the player stands the whole time to perform. The maddalam is a vital instrument in traditional Kerala and jaffna percussion ensembles like Panchavadyam, Keli and Kathakali orchestra.

Except for the central projection, the Maddalam resembles a Mridangam in shape.

== Etymology ==
The name Madhalam is derived from the word Mardhalam which means 'one which receives pressure'. In Sanskrit the instrument is called as Mardhalam.

== Construction ==
The body of the drum is carved from a single block of wood, usually of the jackfruit tree, which is dried for about a month before being hollowed out. The two heads are of animal hide, and a finished instrument weighs around 20 kilograms. Woods such as karingali and chempakam are also used, and the hide is bound to the body with a paste of boiled rice and charcoal.

Much of the manufacture is concentrated in Peruvemba, a village about 15 kilometres from Palakkad town, where families of the Kollan community have been making the maddalam and other percussion instruments for over two centuries. The Maddalam of Palakkad is registered as a geographical indication of India in the handicraft category, with the registration made in the 2008–09 period and a logo registration following in 2015–16.

== Types ==
The instrument has two forms. The larger suddha maddalam is tied at the waist, and the smaller toppi maddalam was slung from the neck of the player. The toppi maddalam was once part of the Kathakali ensemble but fell out of use there, and the suddha maddalam is the form now played.

== In performance ==
In panchavadyam, the Kerala temple ensemble of five instruments, the maddalam plays alongside the thimila, edakka, ilathalam and kombu. It is counted among the deva vadyas, or divine instruments, an association drawn from its place in accounts of the dance of Shiva.

In the Kathakali orchestra the maddalam is played together with the chenda, and its softer tone comes to the fore when female characters are on stage. The historian A. Sreedhara Menon attributes the introduction of the chenda and the maddalam into Kathakali to the Vettathu Raja, a seventeenth-century chieftain whose reforms of the art are known as the Vettathu sampradayam.

The maddalam also appears in other Kerala ensembles. The band that accompanies Velakali, a martial dance performed at temples including the Padmanabhaswamy Temple in Thiruvananthapuram, consists of the kombu, the kurumkuzhal, the thappu and the maddalam. In Chavittu Nadakam, the Christian dance drama of central Kerala, the maddalam formed part of an orchestra that also included the chenda, mridangam, nadaswaram, violin and harmonium.

The maddalam is among the subjects taught at Kerala Kalamandalam, where beginners first practice their strokes on a wooden board called the shravana palaka before advancing to the instrument. Players wear protective rings called chuttu on their fingers.

== Using style ==
In ancient times Madhalam was played by suspending it from the neck of the player and later in the 1920s Madhalam maestro Venkichan Swamy changed the style to the way it was suspended from the waist of the player.

== See also ==
- Pandi Melam
- Panchari melam
- Thayambaka
- Panchavadyam
- Maddalam and Chenda Keli
- Kalamandalam Sankara Warrier
