= NID =

Nid or NID may refer to:

== Science ==
- Nidogen-1, an extracellular protein
- Neuronal intestinal dysplasia, a condition involving abnormalities with the nerves supplying the bowel

== Telecommunications ==
- Namespace Identifier, part of a Uniform Resource Name
- Network interface device, in telecommunications, providing demarcation between carrier and customer wiring

== Organizations ==
- Naval Intelligence Department (Royal Navy), the intelligence arm of the British Admiralty from 1887 until 1912
- National Institute of Cultural Heritage, a Polish governmental institution
- National Institutes of Design, a group of Indian public design universities
  - National Institute of Design, the primary institute, in Ahmedabad, Gujarat
  - National Institute of Design, Andhra Pradesh, design school in Vijayawada, Andhra Pradesh
  - National Institute of Design, Madhya Pradesh, design school in Bhopal, Madhya Pradesh
  - National Institute of Design, Haryana, design school in Kurukshetra, Haryana
  - National Institute of Design, Assam, design school in Jorhat, Assam
- Naval Intelligence Division (United Kingdom), of the British Admiralty, prior to 1965
- Naval Intelligence Division (Israel), a staff unit in the Israeli navy headquarters
- National Investigation Department of Nepal, an intelligence agency of Nepal
- NID (Stargate), a fictional secret government organization in the television series Stargate SG-1
- Nieuport-Delage, an aircraft company from the 1920s and 1930s

== Places ==
- The Nidelva or Nid River in Trondheim, Norway
- Nevada Irrigation District, in the Sierra Nevada foothills of California, organized to supply irrigation water

== Other ==
- National Inventory of Dams, an American database documenting dams in the United States and its territories
- Nieuwe Intercity Dubbeldekker, the renovated NS DD-AR train
- Nimzo-Indian Defence, a chess opening
- Srettha Thavisin (born 1962), nicknamed Nid, Prime Minister of Thailand

== See also ==
- Nidd (disambiguation)
