= National Institute of Design, Ahmedabad =

Public design university in Ahmedabad, India

Coordinates: 23°0′40″N 72°34′10″E

National Institute of Design
- Type: Public
- Established: 1961; 65 years ago
- Academic affiliations: UGC; AIU; WDO
- Chairperson: Joint Secretary, DPIIT, Ministry of Commerce & Industry, Government of India
- Director: Dr. Ashok Mondal
- Undergraduates: ~120
- Postgraduates: ~350
- Doctoral students: 5 (full-time), 8 (part-time)
- Location: Ahmedabad (Main campus), Gandhinagar & Bengaluru (Extension campus)
- Campus: Urban
- Language: English
- Website: www.nid.edu

The National Institute of Design (NID) is a public design university in Paldi, Ahmedabad, with extension campuses in Gandhinagar and Bengaluru. Regarded as one of the foremost design schools in Asia as surveyed by Bloomberg Businessweek in 2009 and on Ranker, it is ranked 51-100 among the top art and design institutes in the world as of 2022 by QS. The university, along with the other NIDs across India, functions as an autonomous institute under the Department for Promotion of Industry and Internal Trade, Ministry of Commerce and Industry, Government of India. NID has been accorded an Institute of National Importance under the National Institute of Design Act, 2014.

Location of the NIDs.

== History ==
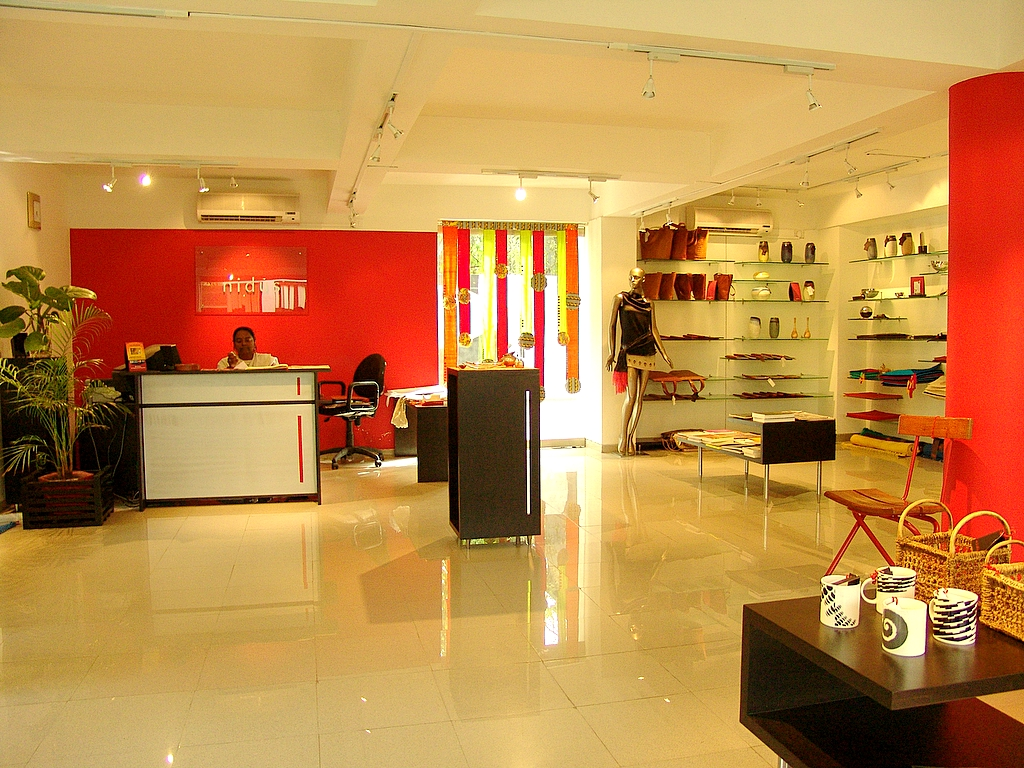
NIDUS, Ahmedabad

As a result of the Industrial Policy Resolution of 1956, the Government of India invited the design team of Charles and Ray Eames to recommend a program of design to serve as an aid to small industries in India. Based on their document, The India Report, the central government set up the National Institute of Design in 1961 as an autonomous national institution for research, service and training in industrial design and visual communication. The Sarabhai family, especially siblings Gautam Sarabhai and Gira Sarabhai, played a major role in the establishment of the institute. Designer and sculptor Dashrath Patel was its founder-secretary, and industrial designer H. Kumar Vyas served as NID's first full-time professor. Patel held the post until 1981, and was awarded the Padma Shri by the central government the same year. In 2011, Vyas was awarded the Sir Misha Black Medal, given to individuals across the globe who have made a significant contribution to design education. The Sarabhais were instrumental in helping NID to form a structure of its own in its early years by inviting a number of foreign designers, architects and artists to India. In the 1950s, Gautam, Gira and Gita Sarabhai were learning from, collaborating and organising educational exchanges with designers like Frei Otto, Adrian Frutiger, John Cage, Robert Rauschenberg, the Eameses, and Louis Kahn amongst many others, at NID. The first Moog synthesisers were brought to India from New York City, the United States by David Tudor when Billy Klüver suggested that NID should collaborate with the international arts collaboration organisation Experiments in Art and Technology. In the 1970s, Lowell Cross, a close collaborator of Tudor and Cage, worked at NID as a professor and technical advisor for electronic music. In 1979, NID hosted the United Nations' first global congress on design from 14 to 24 January. Along with the Indian Institute of Technology Bombay, NID hosted the 'Design for Development' congress in 2016, following a series of working party discussions and initiatives led by the International Council of Societies of Industrial Design (ICSID) and the United Nations Industrial Development Organization (UNIDO).

NID's logo designed by Adrian Frutiger

NID's logo was designed by the Swiss type-designer Adrian Frutiger in the 1960s, while he was visiting NID as a consultant. The institute was founded and initially known as the 'National Institute of Industrial Design', and then as the 'National Design Institute', before being renamed to its final and current name, 'National Institute of Design', in the 1970s.

== Extension campuses ==
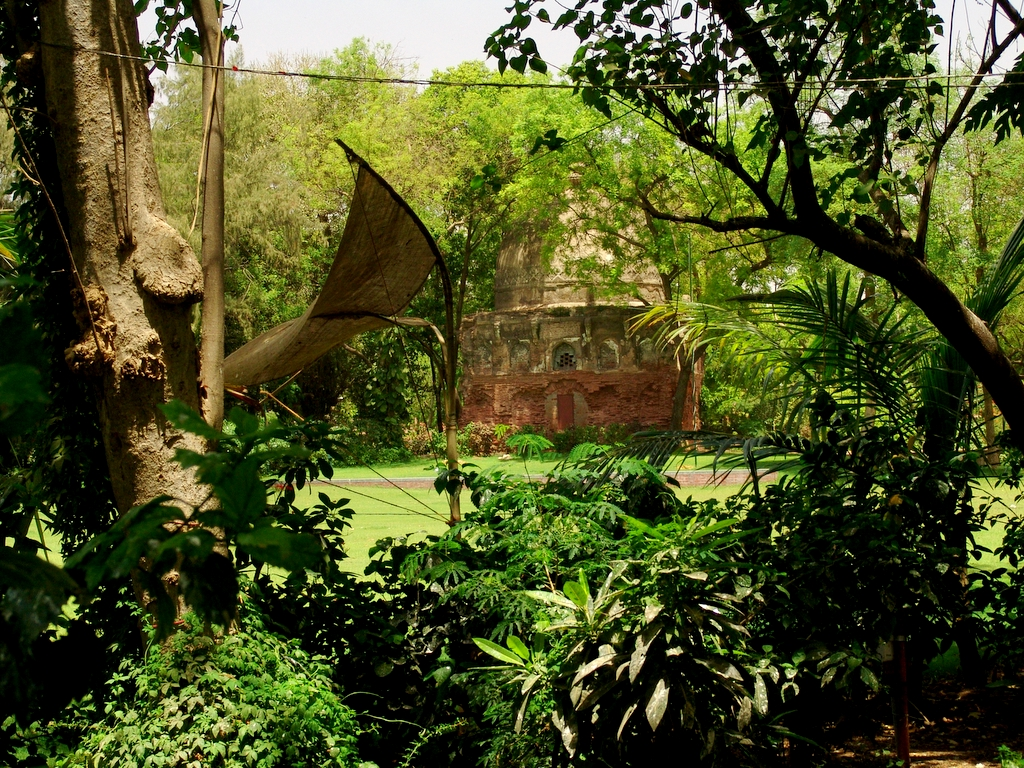
A historic monument within the NID campus, Ahmedabad, popularly known as the Eames Plaza

The institute has its main campus in Ahmedabad, with additional satellite campuses in Gandhinagar and Bengaluru.

Name	Established	State/UT
Main campus, Ahmedabad	1961	Gujarat
PG campus, Gandhinagar	19 July 2004	Gujarat
PG and R&D campus, Bengaluru	31 March 2006	Karnataka

National Institutes of Design
#	Institute	City	State	Founded	Website
1	National Institute of Design, Ahmedabad	Ahmedabad	Gujarat	1961	nid.edu
2	National Institute of Design, Andhra Pradesh	Amaravati	Andhra Pradesh	2015	nid.ac.in
3	National Institute of Design, Haryana	Kurukshetra	Haryana	2016	nidh.ac.in
4	National Institute of Design, Madhya Pradesh	Bhopal	Madhya Pradesh	2019	nidmp.ac.in
5	National Institute of Design, Assam	Jorhat	Assam	2019	nidj.ac.in

The creation of four additional NIDs was suggested as part of the central government's 2007 National Design Policy.

=== Main campus, Ahmedabad ===
After the Eameses presented The India Report, Gira and Gautam Sarabhai, in consultation with other notable architects and designers, felt that Ahmedabad, not Bangaluru or Fatehpur Sikri, as the Eameses had suggested, was the most suitable site given its architecture and textile hotspots, and should be the institute's primary location.

The main campus in Paldi, Ahmedabad, offers both undergraduate and postgraduate courses in design across several disciplines.

==== Conception ====
Initially operational out of the Calico Mills complex loaned from the Sarabhai family, it moved to the Sanskar Kendra, a building designed by Le Corbusier. Eventually Seth Chinubhai Chimanlal offered a vast expanse of land for the NID campus for a token fee of one Indian rupee. The buildings, as per Charles Eames, were to be "un-monumental, anonymous, unpretentious, pleasant, workable and non-shoddy".

Gautam and Gira Sarabhai worked on the building plan for NID in consultation with various architects, engineers and designers. It was meant to be a modern experiment and its underlying philosophy was that the problems of architecture, structural design and construction techniques should be resolved integrally. The Sarabhais said that the two qualities that resonated deeply with the architecture are the Bauhaus aesthetic and modern sensibility.

==== Planning and construction ====
The building is constructed on stilts. The ground floor was utilized as a public area with common rooms and a canteen as storage for raw materials. Workshops and laboratories were on the first floor. Workshops for photography, wood, metal, plastics, ceramics and glass were given separate wings. All wings were connected to the core building. Drafting studios, seminar rooms and the library were on the second floor. Double glazing between the studios and the workshops enabled students to observe the proceedings on the production floors without being disturbed by machines. Classroom spaces at NID are modular and transparent, which the principals said emphasised NID's core philosophy of "learning by doing".

=== PG Campus, Gandhinagar ===
The 'PG campus' at Gandhinagar is an extension campus of NID, established in July 2004. It provides postgraduate courses in several disciplines.

=== PG and R&D Campus, Bengaluru ===
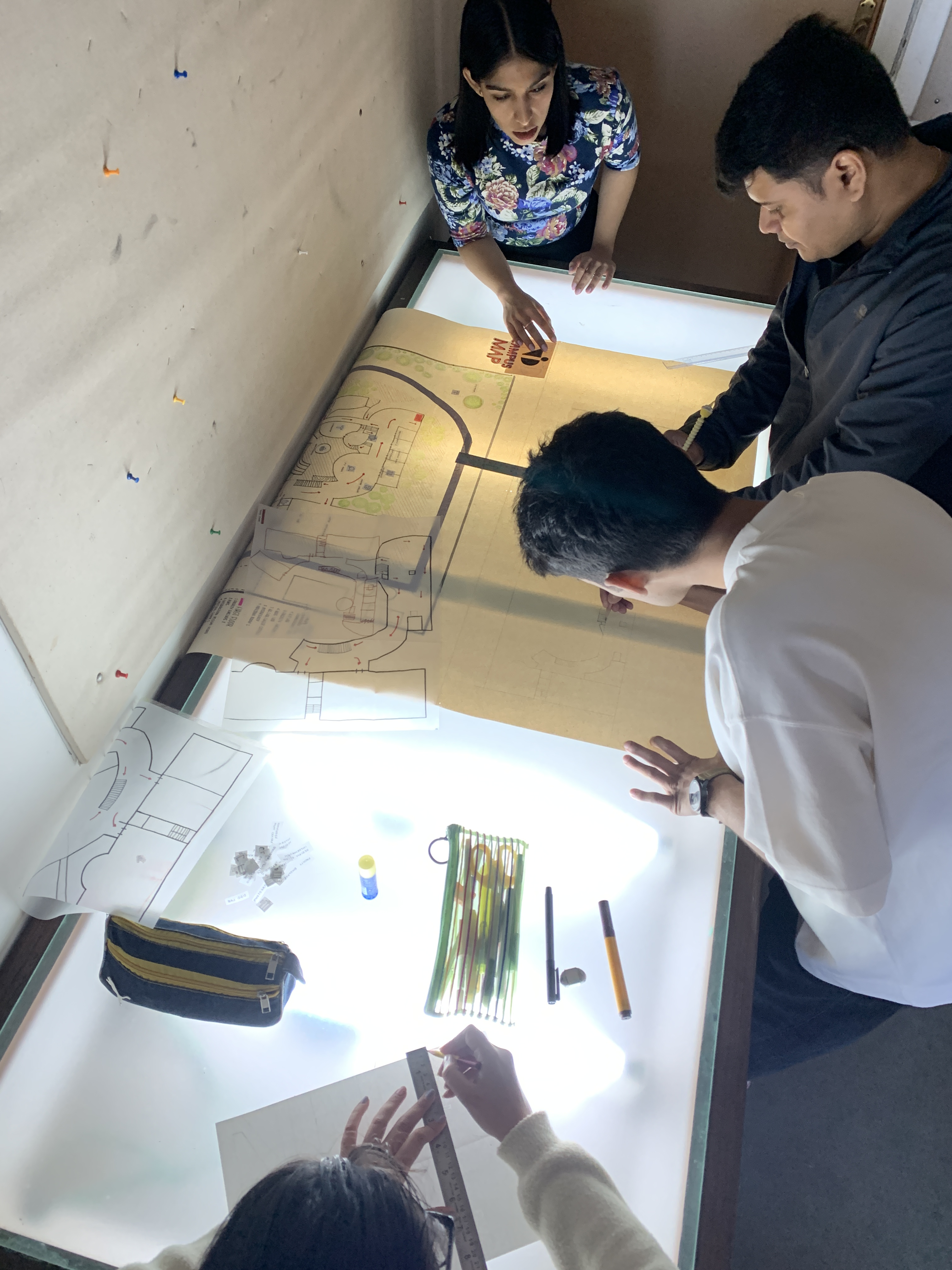
Students of National Institute of Design Bengaluru tracing using a lightbox at the cartography workshop

An additional extension campus for NID was later planned to be built at Yeshwantpur, a suburb in northwestern Bengaluru. The new campus was built for IN₹ 7.5 crores and was inaugurated on 31 March 2006 by Dr. Darlie O'Koshy, who was the executive director of NID at the time. The 'PG and Research & Development campus' of NID houses additional facilities for industrial development and design research, and offers doctoral courses in design as well as postgraduate courses in many disciplines.

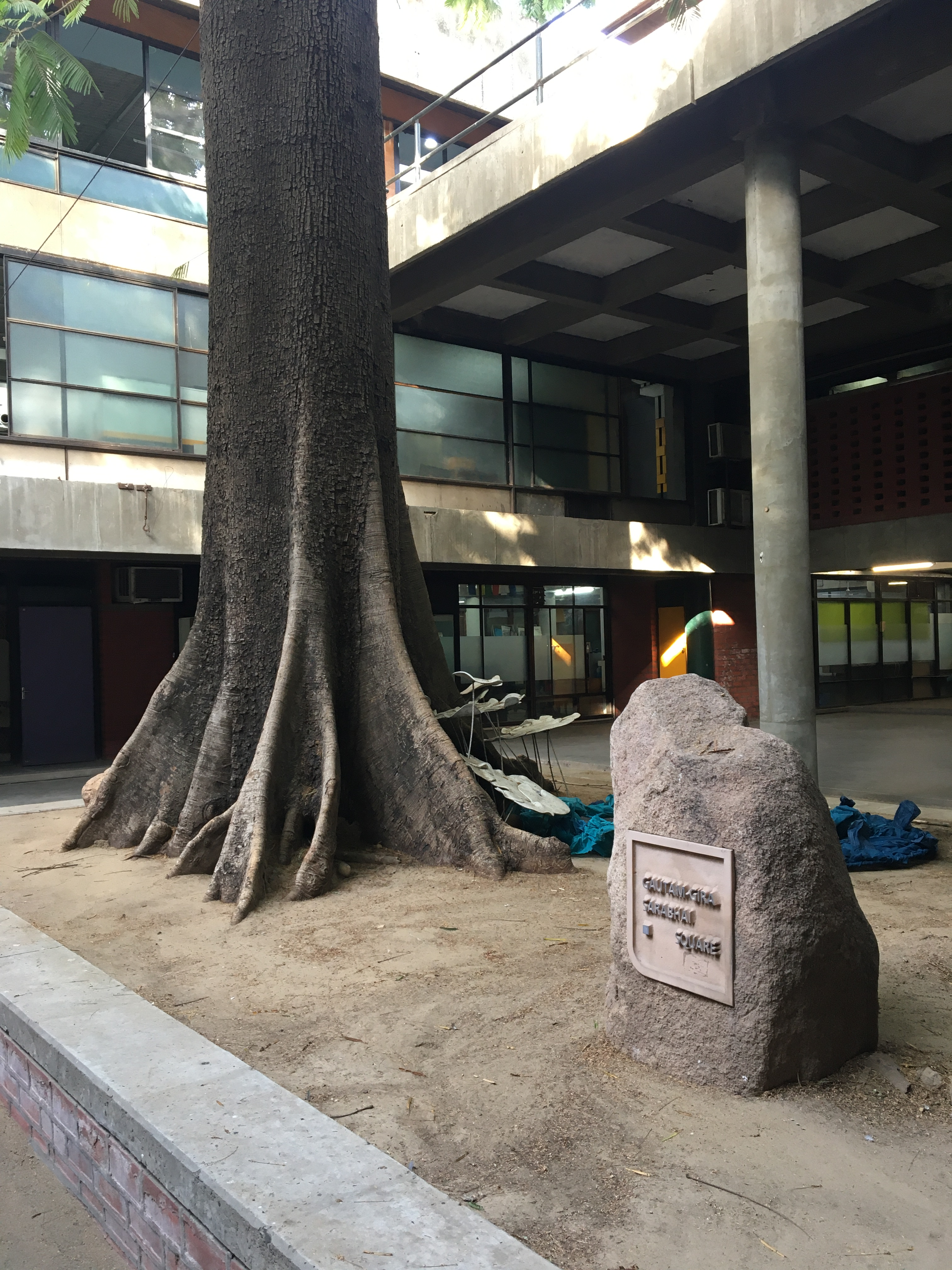
Gautam Gira Sarabhai Square inside the NID building. Named after the founders of the institution.

== Admissions ==
NID is known for its very limited seats across its courses, and its incredibly low acceptance rate of around only 1%. The NID Design Aptitude Test (NID-DAT) is a two-stage national-level entrance examination for the NIDs, organised every year by the NID Admissions Cell for admissions to undergraduate and post-graduate courses in the universities. The first stage of the examination is NID-DAT Prelims, which is a pen-and-paper design and general aptitude test, and the second stage is NID-DAT Mains, which is usually an in-studio design test and may also include a personal interview and portfolio review. The tests aim to evaluate the candidate's visualisation skills, creative & observation skills, knowledge, comprehension, analytical ability, et cetera.

== Academics ==
The courses available at NID span a wide range of disciplines (like graphic design, product design, interior design, filmmaking, animation, photography, etc.) and include Bachelor of Design (B.Des.), Graduate Diploma Program in Design (GDPD), Master of Design (M.Des.) and doctoral programs (PhD). Several international programmes and foundation courses are also available.

== Notable alumni ==
Notable alumni of the institute include:

- Dayanita Singh, photographer and contemporary artist
- Lekha Washington, actress, artist and product designer
- Harun Robert, artist and television personality
- Orijit Sen, graphic designer
- Aditya Vikram Sengupta, film director, cinematographer and graphic designer
- Pan Nalin, filmmaker
- Rahul Mishra, fashion designer
- Aditya Pande, artist
- Ishu Patel, filmmaker
- Nina Sabnani
- Pandu (actor), Tamil comedian
- M. P. Ranjan

== Notable faculty ==
- Dashrath Patel
- Helena Perheentupa
- Nina Sabnani
- Nelly Sethna
- Aditi Ranjan
- M. P. Ranjan

== See also ==
- Other National Institutes of Design
- The India Report
- The Sarabhai family
- Calico Museum of Textiles
- Sanskar Kendra
- IIT Bombay IDC School of Design

== Sources ==
- Health Care Innovation Takes the Stage at ACC.15
