= National Institute of Design (disambiguation) =

National Institute of Design may refer to:

- National Institute of Design, Ahmedabad, with main campus in Ahmedabad, Gujarat, India
  - National Institute of Design, Bengaluru, an R&D campus in Bangalore, Karnataka
  - National Institute of Design, Bhopal, a campus in Bhopal, Madhya Pradesh
  - National Institute of Design, Gandhinagar, a post-graduate campus in Gandhinagar, Gujarat
  - National Institute of Design, Jorhat, a campus in Jorhat, Assam
  - National Institute of Design, Kurukshetra, a campus in Kurukshetra, Haryana
  - National Institute of Design, Vijayawada, a campus in Vijayawada, Andhra Pradesh
