= Madhurima Patni =

Indian designer and educator

- Other names: Gitto
- Occupation: Designer
- Employer(s): National Institute of Design, Ahmedabad, IICD
- Known for: Textile Design & Craft Documentation

Madhurima Patni Bhowmick, also known as Gitto, was one of the first student-faculty members, along with Aditi Ranjan and others, in the department of Textile Design at National Institute of Design, Ahmedabad. She guided several students during her tenure as a faculty member, and is responsible for several craft and textile related projects and publications. She is a practicing designer, based in Jaipur.

== Work ==
Gitto was a faculty member at National Institute of Design, who along with Helena Perheentupa and others was responsible for structuring the 6-week craft documentation exercise for students. After the 2001 earthquake in Gujarat, while working with Gurjari, Gitto gave a set of designs to the artisans in Kutch that eventually became a part of the repertoire for contemporary Ajrakh artisans.

== See also ==
- Jyotindra Jain
- Aditi Ranjan
