= Aaquib Wani =

Indian designer

- Born: New Delhi, India
- Occupations: Experiential designer, art director
- Organization: Aaquib Wani Design
- Known for: Designing official sports kits for the India national cricket team, 2024 Paris Olympics Indian contingent, and 2022 Asian Games Indian contingent

Aaquib Wani is an Indian experiential designer and art director based in New Delhi. He is the founder and creative director of Aaquib Wani Design. Wani's when integrates traditional Indian heritage and crafts into contemporary spatial and apparel design. He has designed official sports kits for the India national cricket team, as well as the Indian contingents for the 2024 Summer Olympics and the 2022 Asian Games.

== Early life ==
Wani was born and raised in New Delhi, though his family is from Kashmir. His father's business in Kashmiri arts led Wani to engage with traditional artisans and intricate local designs during his childhood. Growing up, Wani struggled with academics and failed the 11th grade twice. Despite having no formal education or collegiate training in design, he took a keen interest in music and art, participating in his school's orchestra.

== Career ==
=== Early career (2006–2017) ===
Wani's career in design began through his passion for music. From 2006 to 2014, he was the lead guitarist for a thrash metal band named Phobia. To help promote the band, he began designing their merchandise, album covers, and gig posters, which eventually led to design requests from other musical acts. In 2009, he joined the music magazine Rock Street Journal as a graphic design intern. By 2013, he had been promoted to the role of art director.

In 2014, Wani joined Scenografia Sumant, a studio run by contemporary scenographer Sumant Jayakrishnan. There, Wani began doing large-scale 3D spatial design, working on music festivals, weddings, and exhibitions. As part of Jayakrishnan's team, he represented India at the London Design Biennale in 2016.

=== Aaquib Wani Design (2018–present) ===
Wani founded his independent studio, Aaquib Wani Design, in 2018, focusing on world-building, interactive installations, and experiential design. His work is noted for blending modern aesthetics with traditional Indian art forms. For Isha Ambani's wedding events in Udaipur, his studio conceptualized the "Swadesh Bazaar," a craft exhibition featuring 108 traditional Indian crafts. For this project, Wani brought 150 artisans from West Bengal to create intricate decor using sholapith. He also led the spatial design and brand identity for the international music festival Lollapalooza India.

Wani also launched "Aaquib Wani Custom Wearables," an initiative where he partnered with local street sign painters and rural artisans to create hand-painted jackets and apparel, incorporating traditional styles like Madhubani and Pattachitra.

==== Sports apparel design ====
Wani's studio has designed apparel for major Indian sports teams, aiming to embed cultural storytelling into athletic wear.

- Real Kashmir FC: Reflecting his own heritage, Wani incorporated traditional Kashmiri Kani Pashmina shawl patterns into the jersey design for Real Kashmir FC.
- Rajasthan Royals: For the 2023 Indian Premier League, Wani designed kits for the Rajasthan Royals. The playing jersey was inspired by Rajasthan's traditional stepwells, while the training kit featured jali (latticed screen) motifs.
- Asian Games 2022: Wani designed the official tracksuits and sportswear for the Indian contingent at the 2022 Asian Games. He sourced diverse regional motifs—such as Bagh prints, bamboo basketry patterns, and Telia Rumal—inspired by Aditi Ranjan's book Handmade in India.
- Indian National Cricket Team: Working with Adidas, Wani designed the official match kits for India's men's and women's cricket teams. The ODI jersey featured an Ikat pattern inspired by the tiger, while the T20 jersey incorporated architectural arches from Indian heritage monuments and a tricolor shoulder design.
- Paris 2024 Olympics: JSW Group commissioned Wani to design the official ceremonial and athletic kits for Team India at the 2024 Summer Olympics. The designs were conceptualized around the diverse terrains and topographical landscapes of India.
- Ahmedabad Marathon: Wani designed the official jersey for the 9th Adani Ahmedabad Marathon, utilizing community-sourced design ideas and incorporating visual elements inspired by recycled plastic bottle caps to promote sustainability.

== Awards and recognition ==
- 2021: Forbes India 30 Under 30 for Design.
- 2023: Featured in the Grazia Cool List.
