= Tapas Sen =

Indian stage lighting designer

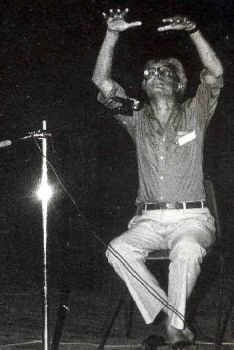
- Born: 11 September 1924; Dhubri, Assam, India
- Died: 28 June 2006; Calcutta, West Bengal, India (now Kolkata)
- Occupation: Light Designer

Tapas Sen ( 11 September 1924 – 28 June 2006) was a noted Indian stage lighting designer, who was an important figure in 20th-century Indian theatre. He started working with Bengali theatre movement in Kolkata in the late 1940s, along with noted directors, Utpal Dutt and Shambhu Mitra. Later he became a founding member of the Indian People's Theatre Association's (IPTA), Delhi chapter, and worked closely with Hindi theatre. Through his career stretching five decades he worked theatre directors, Ebrahim Alkazi, Vijay Tendulkar, and also dancers Sadhana Bose, Chandralekha, Birju Maharaj and Kelucharan Mahapatra. He was known not only for his creative stage lighting, but also had a significant impact on the work of leading theatre director of the time.

He was awarded the 1974 Sangeet Natak Akademi Award in 1974, given by the Sangeet Natak Akademi, India's National Academy for Music, Dance and Drama, and Sangeet Natak Akademi Fellowship in 2004.

== Career ==
Tapas Sen was born in 1924 in Dhubri, Assam. His father was Matilal Sen and mother's name was Subarnalata He started his career in theater with the production of a shadow play on the 1943 Bengal famine with Mrinal Sen. Amongst his most noted lighting installations are for son et lumière, sound-and-light-shows at historical venues in Delhi, like the Red Fort, Purana Quila and at the Qutb Minar. He also created lighting for noted stage venues across India including Birla Theatre in Kolkata, Siri Fort Auditorium, Kamani Auditorium in Delhi, and Rabindra Natya Manch in Mumbai. Besides doing architectural lighting design for important outdoor venues and monuments like Khajuraho, Konark, Elephanta and Ujjain. In 1988, he designed the lighting for the opening ceremonies of the "Festival of India" at Moscow and Paris, under Dashrath Patel. He was also part of the 50-person team for the lighting design of the Eiffel Tower in 2000. The entire design was done by 50 light designers and engineers using 5 lifts for a span of 2 years, 2 months and 5 days.

He was awarded the 1974 Sangeet Natak Akademi Award in Theatre Arts, the highest Indian recognition given to practicing artists, conferred by the Sangeet Natak Akademi, India's National Academy for Music, Dance and Drama, and subsequently the academy also the highest honour the Sangeet Natak Akademi Fellowship in 2004. He also was awarded the Kalidas Samman, by Government of Madhya Pradesh for the year 1997-98. He was a fellow of the Lighting Designers, UK and the Indian Society of Lighting Engineers.

He remained active even into his late years, in January 2006, he did the lighting for a production of Tagore's play Visarjan which premiered at Madhusudan Mancha in Kolkata. He died on 28 June 2006 in Kolkata due to a heart attack, at the age of 81. His body was donated for medical research.

=== Books ===
- Shadows & Spectra (2026). Edited by Asish Goswami; translated into English by Mou Chakraborty; foreword by Santanu Das. Kolkata: Sister Nivedita University Press (SNUP). ISBN 9788199745674.
