= M. P. Ranjan =

Indian designer and educator (1950–2015)

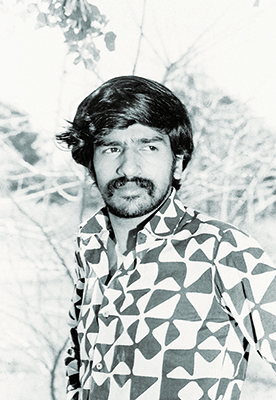
- Born: 1950; Madras, Tamil Nadu
- Died: 9 August 2015 (aged 64–65); Ahmedabad, Gujarat
- Occupations: Designer; innovator; educator
- Employer(s): National Institute of Design, Ahmedabad; CEPT University; Ahmedabad University
- Known for: Bamboo and cane toys & furniture; design education
- Notable work: Handmade in India; Bamboo and Cane Crafts of North East India
- Spouse: Aditi Ranjan (m. 1981)
- Awards: Kamala Samman Award with Aditi Ranjan

Mundon Pandan Ranjan (1950 – 9 August 2015) was an Indian designer and educator. He was a polymath, exploring various genres and methodologies in the field design innovation and education. Ranjan is known for his book Handmade in India: A Geographic Encyclopedia of Indian Handicrafts based on Indian arts and crafts that he edited along with his partner and fellow design pedagogue Aditi Ranjan. He worked at National Institute of Design, CEPT University and Ahmedabad University.

== Life and work ==
M. P. Ranjan was born in 1950 in Madras (now Chennai), Tamil Nadu. His father, M. V. Gopala played a role in developing his inclination towards furniture design. He joined National Institute of Design in 1969 to pursue Furniture and Product Design, and went on to become a member of faculty at the Institute by 1972. Between 1974 and 1976, he worked as a professional designer in Madras, and returned to the faculty of NID in 1976.

From a ten year period of 1981 to 1991, he headed the consulting arm of NID and facilitated numerous collaborative projects between the faculties and corporate or government clients. Since 1981, he taught core design theory courses which was named “Design Concepts and Concerns” which concerned itself with design thinking and strategising.

=== Documentation and publications ===
M. P. Ranjan studied the crafts of North East India, along with his colleagues Ghanshyam Pandya and Nilam Iyer and published the book Bamboo and Cane Crafts of Northeast India in 1986.

Ranjan got interested in the craft documentation work in North East India, inspired by Aditi Ranjan, his colleague and later wife and took a trip to the North East of India 1978. In order to demonstrate the role of bamboo as a sustainable craft and industrial material of the future, he executed numerous projects for the United Nations Development Programme (UNDP) and other Government agencies.

He also co-authored a book titled Handmade in India: A Geographic Encyclopedia of Indian Handicrafts (2009) with his wife Aditi Ranjan that was produced over five years, from 2002-07 offering a detailed documentation of India’s art and craft traditions. The project was conceptualised by the Ranjans and involved extensive fieldwork across the country.

== See also ==
- Channapatna toys
- Aditi Ranjan
