= Dashrath Patel =

Indian artist (1927–2010)

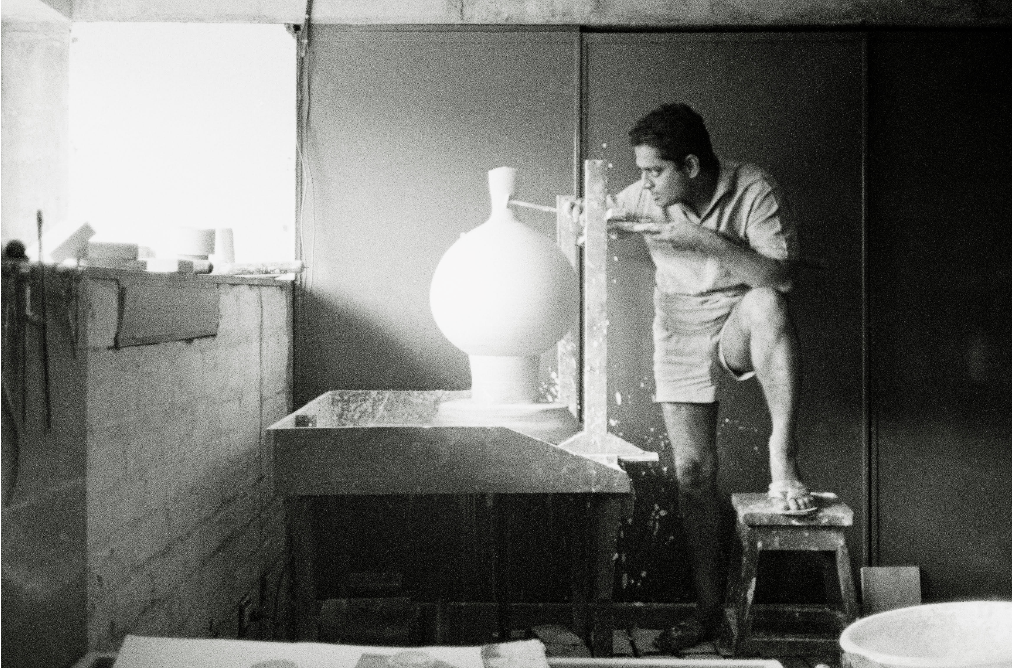
- Dashrath Patel in the Ceramic Studio at the National Institute of Design, Ahmedabad c.1965
- Born: 1927
- Died: 2010 (aged 82–83)
- Occupations: Designer, Educator, Sculptor
- Employer: National Institute of Design, Ahmedabad
- Known for: Exhibition Design, Design Education, Photography
- Partner: Chandralekha (dancer)
- Awards: Padma Shri, Padma Bhushan

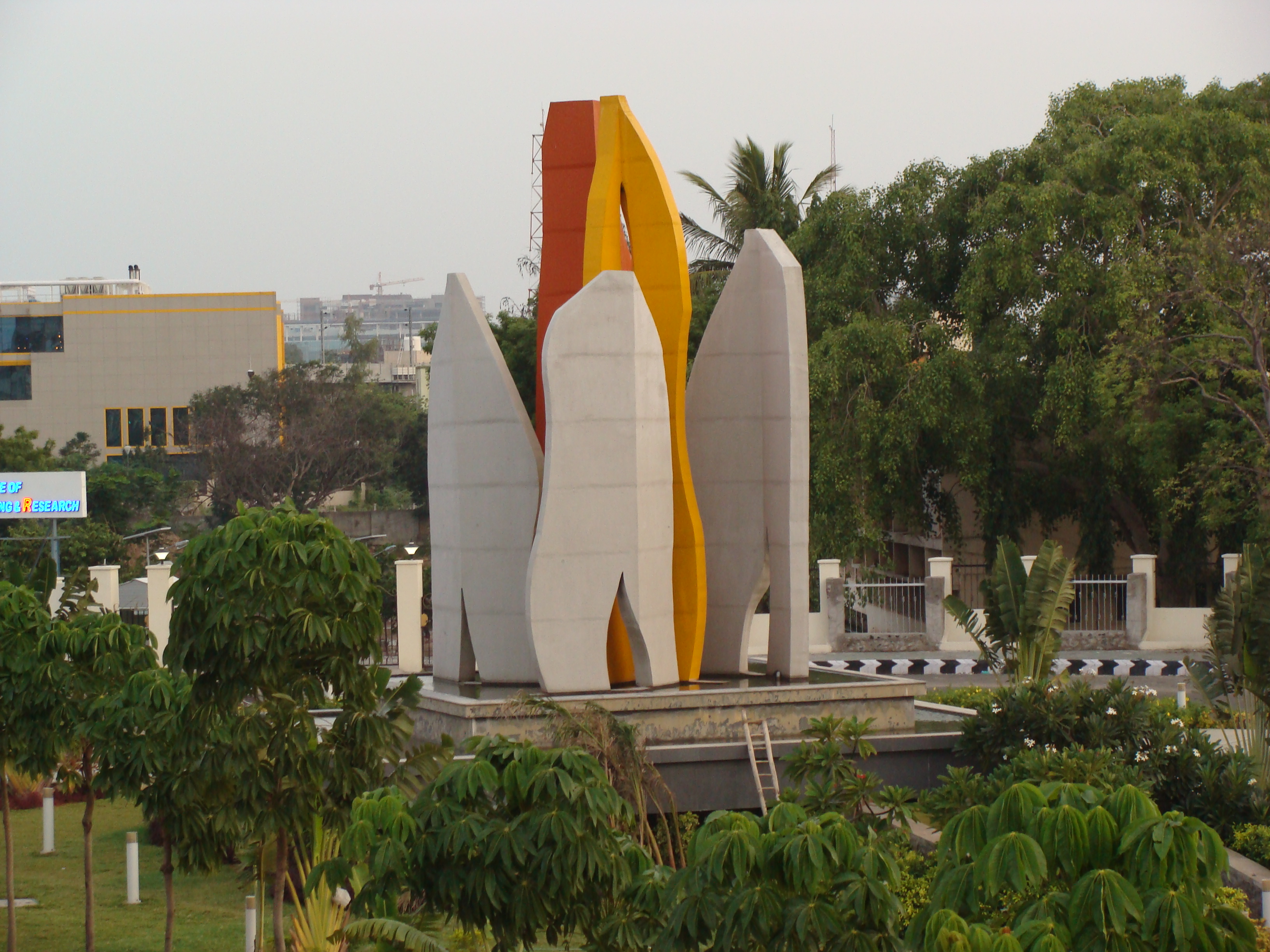
'Flame-thrower', a statue at the entrance of IT corridor Rajiv Gandhi Salai, Chennai.

Dashrath Patel (1927 – 1 December 2010) was an Indian designer, sculptor, and was one of the first teachers at the National Institute of Design (NID), Ahmedabad, from 1961 to 1981.

He was awarded the Padma Shri by Government of India in 1981, followed by the Padma Bhushan, posthumously in 2011.

== Early life and education ==
Born in 1927 in Sojitra, Gujarat, Patel studied fine arts at Government College of Fine Arts, Chennai (1949–53), where Debi Prasad Roy Choudhury was his mentor; thereafter studied painting, sculpture and ceramics during his Post Graduate studies at École des Beaux-Arts, Paris (1953–1955).

== Career ==
He practiced in diverse art fields as a painter, ceramist, a graphic designer, industrial design and exhibition design. Early in his career he was contemporary of Tyeb Mehta, M.F. Hussain and V. S. Gaitonde who were together in the 1950s in Bhulabhai Desai Institute, Mumbai, and often exhibited alongside them. Later Henri Cartier-Bresson introduced him to photography, after former visited his exhibition at the Galerie Barbizon, Paris. He worked at the National Institute of Design, Ahmedabad as a designer and as faculty in Industrial Design, he also established the ceramics department at the institute. He left NID in 1981, and went on to establish the Rural Design School in Sewapuri, near Varanasi.

He has collaborated creatives like Charles Eames, Louis I. Kahn, Frei Otto, Harindranath Chattopadhyay, dancer Chandralekha. He died in Ahmedabad after a brief illness, at the age of 83 on 1 December 2010.

During the last decade of his life, he worked largely from Alibag, near Mumbai, where the Dashrath Patel Museum now houses his multidisciplinary oeuvre.

== See also ==
- Chandralekha (dancer)
- National Institute of Design, Ahmedabad
