= Ananthan =

Ananthan is a surname and a given name. Notable people with the name include:

Surname:

- Garggi Ananthan, Indian actress and theatre artist working in Malayalam cinema and theatre
- Kumari Ananthan (1933–2025), Indian politician, leader of the Tamil Nadu Congress Committee
- Ramkripa Ananthan (born 1971), Indian car designer, head of design at Ola Electric
- Sivasakthy Ananthan (born 1964), Sri Lankan Tamil politician and Member of Parliament
- Thanuja Ananthan (born 1985), Malaysian model, Miss World Malaysia 2009
- Uday Ananthan, Indian filmmaker who works in Malayalam cinema

Given name:

- Ananthan Somasundaram, Malaysian politician, Senator

== See also ==
- Aayiram Naavulla Ananthan (transl. Thousand-tongued Anandan), 1996 Indian Malayalam-language medical action drama film
- Death of Kugan Ananthan (died 2009), Royal Malaysian Police detainee who died in a police lock-up
