= Binita Desai =

Indian animator

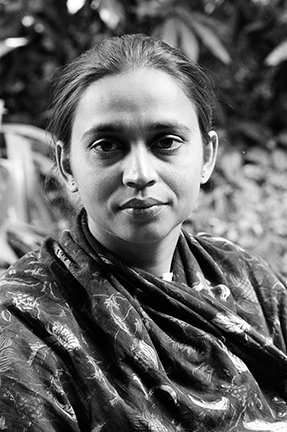
- Binita Desai at the National Institute of Design Ahmedabad during her time as a faculty member in Visual Communication discipline.
- Education: Maharaja Sayajirao University of Baroda
- Occupations: Animator; designer; educator
- Employer(s): DA-IICT, Gandhinagar, National Institute of Design, Ahmedabad (former)

Binita Desai is an Indian animator, designer and a professor who designed the animation programme for postgraduate studies at the National Institute of Design, Ahmedabad along with Nina Sabnani, I. S. Mathur and R. L. Mistry. She is currently a professor at Dhirubhai Ambani Institute of Information and Communication Technology (DA-IICT).

== Life and work ==
Desai graduated from Maharaja Sayajirao University of Baroda where she completed her BFA in Applied Arts. She then joined the National Institute of Design (NID), Ahmedabad post her graduation with her friends Nina Sabnani and Chitra Sarathy in 1980 where she attended an animation workshop conducted by Claire Weeks. Post this, she was invited to stay at NID and trained with Roger Noake under the United Nations Development Programme training program. During this time, she made two films Cirrus Skies (1984) and Patang (Kite, 1984). The former film depicted the changes observed in the sky's cloud formations. Whereas, the latter film traced the movement of a kite through the eyes of its flier. In 1985, Desai, along with Nina Sabnani, I. S. Mathur and R. L. Mistry conceived a program for postgraduate studies in animation at NID. They became the first coordinators of the program. A two and a half year advanced entry programme was started in 1985 and a short one-year course was introduced next year. Along with their students, they created animated films that focused on educational and developmental topics like road safety, family planning, dowry, energy as well as literary and artistic themes. Desai also co-edited the magazine Young Designers from 1990 to 1994 which featured projects of graduating students from NID. She taught at NID until 1997 before working as a freelance designer till 2002. Since 2002, she is a professor at DA-IICT, Gandhinagar where she teaches graphic design and animation to undergraduate and postgraduate students. Subsequently, she has been a visiting faculty for the Character Design module and semester jury of the Animation Film Design course at NID Ahmedabad, most recently being in the 2019-20 academic year.

== See also ==
- Nina Sabnani
- Ishu Patel
- National Institute of Design, Ahmedabad
