= Paromita Banerjee =

Indian fashion designer

Paromita Banerjee is an Indian fashion designer and a member of the Fashion Design Council of India.

== Education ==
She studied at the National Institute of Design (NID), Ahmedabad, India and thereafter received a scholarship from Konstfack University of Art and Culture in Stockholm.

== Work ==
Her work is primarily influenced by the concept of “hand-made” handloom fabrics. Her major assignment was for “Handmade in India” in Himachal Pradesh - a project collaboration of DCH and NID.

== Passion ==
Other than her work, her true passion in life is photography. It was her passion for photography that marked her foray into the fashion designing field.
