= Patni (surname) =

Indian surname

The surname Patni/Paatni holds historical and cultural significance in the state of Rajasthan, Uttarakhand, Uttar Pradesh & Gujarat in India. It is associated with various castes like Brahmins, Banias.

Notable people with the surname include:

- Narendra Patni (1942–2014), entrepreneur and IT visionary
- Rajendra Sukhanand Patni (born 1964), Indian politician
- Abdul Rehman Shakir Patni, India politician
- Rajendra Sukhanand Patni, Indian politician (1964–2024)
- Madhurima Patni, Indian designer and educator
