= N. Dharmalingam =

Indian politician

Member of Legislative Assembly, Tamil Nadu
- In office 1971–1976
- Preceded by: M. Anandan
- Succeeded by: M. Sundaram
- Constituency: Rishivandiyam

Personal details
- Political party: Dravida Munnetra Kazhagam
- Children: D. Udaya Kumar

N. Dharmalingam is an Indian politician from Tamil Nadu. He was elected as the Member of Tamil Nadu Legislative Assembly from Rishivandiyam Assembly constituency in 1971 Tamil Nadu Legislative Assembly election representing the Dravida Munnetra Kazhagam. He has a son D. Udaya Kumar, who is the designer of the Indian rupee sign.
