= Binita =

Name list

- Gender: Female
- Language: Hindi, Nepali

Origin
- Region of origin: India, Nepal

Other names
- Related names: Vinita

Binita (Nepali: विनिता) is a name given to females in India and Nepal.

Notable people with the name include:

- Binita Toppo (born 1980), Indian hockey player
- Binita Soren, Indian mountaineer
- Binita Desai, Indian animator and educator
- Binita Prabhu, a fictional character from the British soap opera Doctors

== See also ==
- Vinita (disambiguation)
