= Sumant Jayakrishnan =

Sumant Jayakrishnan is a contemporary Indian set designer, lighting designer and costume designer. He also designs exhibitions. He was trained in NID (National Institute of Design) in Ahmedabad.

== Recent works ==
- A midsummer night's dream (2006) Play directed by Tim Supple, Set and costume design
- Paperdoll (2005) Choreography by Padmini Chettur, Set and lighting design
- Water (2005) Movie directed by Deepa Mehta, Art Direction
