= Aditya Pande =

Indian painter (1976)

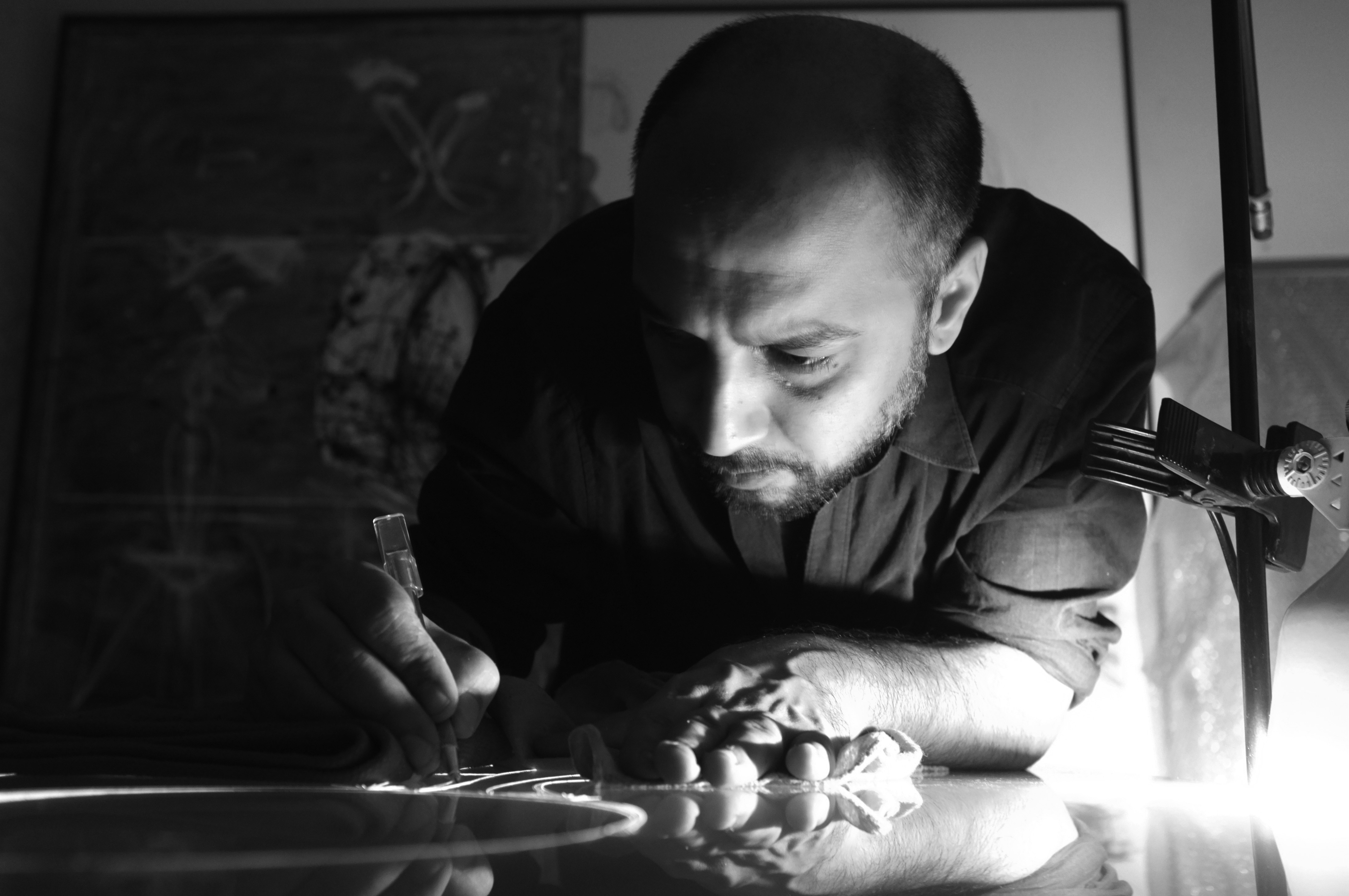
- Aditya Pande, May 2015
- Born: Lucknow, India
- Education: National Institute of Design, Ahmedabad

Aditya Pande (born 1976) is an Indian contemporary artist. His technique often involves a layering of surfaces along with mixed, diverse media ranging from vector drawing, digital photography, ink, acrylic paint to tinsel. His work combines the skills of drawing and printmaking with photography and painting.

== Life ==
Pande was born in Lucknow in 1976, and raised in Chandigarh. He trained at the National Institute of Design in Ahmedabad, from where he graduated in 2001. He held his first solo show, ‘A to Zoo’, at Chatterjee and Lal, Mumbai, in 2008, and his work has been featured in several solo and group exhibitions since. Pande is currently based in New Delhi, India.

== Solo exhibitions ==
2019

SATURDAY, Gallery Nature Morte, New Delhi

2016

All of the Above, Aicon Gallery, New York, USA

2014

H&M, Gallery Nature Morte, New Delhi, India

2012

Half-life, Chatterjee & Lal, Mumbai, India

2011

Happy Birthday, Gallery Nature Morte, Oberoi, Gurgaon, India

2009

Alexia Goethe Gallery, London, UK

in collaboration with Gallery Nature Morte, New Delhi

2008

A To Zoo, Chatterjee and Lal, Mumbai, India

== Group exhibitions ==
2014

The Science of Speed, at Famous Studio, Mahalaxmi, Mumbai

2012

fiVe Chatterjee & Lal, Mumbai

War Zone Kunstmuseum Artemons, Hellmonsodt, Austria

A Further Global Encounter Grosvenor, Vadehra Gallery, London, UK

The Phenomenal World, Otto Zoo Gallery, Milan, Italy

India- Lado A Lado Centro Cultural Banco do, Brasil

Cynical Love: Life in the Everyday, Kiran Nadar Museum of Art, New Delhi

2011

Tolstoy Farm - Archive of Utopia Seven Art Gallery, Lalit Kala Academy, New Delhi

Conundrum, Gallery Nature Morte, Berlin, Germany

2010

Relax the Brain, Gallery Nature Morte, Berlin, Germany

2009

Bose Pacia, New York, USA

Vistar II presented by Seven Arts Limited at The Stainless Gallery, New Delh

2008

Alexia Goethe Gallery, London in collaboration with Gallery Nature Morte, New Delhi

Neti-Neti (Not This, Not This Bose Pacia, New York, USA

New Painting Gallery Nature Morte, New Delhi

Lotus Eaters Collective Ruchikas Art Gallery, Goa

2007

See Saw The Stainless Gallery, New Delhi

The Monsoon Festival 2 Red Earth Gallery Travancore Palace, New Delhi

2006

Visual Arts Gallery, India Habitat Centre, New Delhi

2005

Visual Arts Gallery, India Habitat Centre, New Delhi
