= Shilpa Ranade =

Indian designer, animator, illustrator, filmmaker and academic

- Born: 1966 (age 59–60)
- Occupations: Animator, filmmaker, illustrator, designer and acamedician
- Years active: 1995-present
- Notable work: 'Mani's Dying', 'Goopi Gawaiya Bagha Bajaiya'

Shilpa Ranade (born 1966) is an Indian designer, animator, illustrator, filmmaker and academic. She has been faculty at the Industrial Design Centre at IIT Bombay since 2001. She has directed animated short films for Channel 4, UK and her films have been screened all over the world, winning accolades in some of the most prestigious film festivals. The award-winning animation movie Goopi Gawaiya Bagha Bajaiya was her last full-length feature film which world premiered at the Toronto International Film Festival. Her other films are Naja Goes to School and Mani's Dying.

== Early life and education ==
As a child, she was deeply interested in drawing and art. Her parents encouraged her to pursue a career in an area of her interest. After class 10, she decided to pursue applied art and she went to Sir J.J. Institute of Applied Art where she specialized in Illustration and Video. She then decided to pursue visual communication at I.I.T. Bombay and in 1989, she graduated with Master in Design (Visual Communication) with a specialization in Advanced Illustration and Video. To study animation formally, she pursued her M.Phil in Animation at the Royal College of Art in London. Her thesis was on 'Indigenous Images and Narratives for Socially Relevant Animation'.

== Career ==
In 2001, she joined Industrial Design Centre at I.I.T Bombay and was responsible for setting up the centre's first degree program in animation. Its first batch graduated in 2006.

She has also illustrated numerous books for children for leading publishers in the country including Scholastic, Eklavya, Pratham and Karadi Tales.

Her latest curatorial endeavor includes two large volumes: Plant Life and Child Farmers. While 'Plant Life' is an anthology of children's drawing and writing on their perceptions on lower and higher plants, 'Child Farmers' portrays the lives of the children of the farmers of Vidarbha who lost their fathers to suicide.

In 2013, she directed her first feature-length animation film Goopi Gawaiya Bagha Bajaiya for the Children's Film Society of India. The film is an adaptation of a 1915 children's story by Upendra Kishore Roychowdhury about two musician friends on an adventure. Her film has premiered at Toronto International Film Festival and has been screened at Busan Korea, MAMI India, DIFF Dubai and NYICFF New York among others.

She is also a founding member of Damroo which is responsible for creating content for children where she produced books and films while working closely with children. She has also illustrated numerous books for children for leading publishers in the country such as Scholastic, Eklavya, Pratham and Karadi Tales.

== Filmography ==
Year	Film	Role	Description	Awards
1990	Mani's Dying	Director, Screenwriter, Animator	Animated short film (7 minutes)	Critics Award (1996). Bombay International Short Film Festival
1997	The Childhood of Krishna	Director	Animated Short Film (4 minutes)	
1999	Naja Goes to School	Director	Animated Short Film (7 minutes)	
2013	Goopi Gawaiya Bagha Bajaiya	Director	Animated Feature Film (79 minutes) Best Professional Animated Feature Film (2013). ASIFA Awards India Animation Award (2013). The WIFTS Foundation International Visionary Awards Best Indian Animated Feature Film (2014). FICCI BAF Awards	
