= Nelly Sethna =

Indian weaver (1932–1992)

- Born: Nelly Mehta; 1 November 1932; Bombay, Bombay Presidency
- Died: 1992 (aged 59–60)
- Education: Regent Street Polytechnic; Cranbrook Academy of Art
- Known for: Textile design
- Spouse: Homi Darab Sethna
- Awards: Padma Shri (1985)

Nelly Homi Sethna (née Mehta; 1 November 1932 – 1992) was an Indian weaver, textile designer, researcher, writer and a crafts activist. She worked on the crossroads of Scandinavian modernism and Indian crafts tradition, which shaped her guiding philosophy. Her close association with Kamaladevi Chattopadhyay played an important role in the revival and promotion of traditional Indian crafts.

== Early life and education ==
Born on 1 November 1932 in Bombay, Nelly was the daughter of Pestonji and Goolbanoo Mehta.

Nelly had joined the commercial arts department at Sir J. J. School of Art in Bombay. However, she had defied the head of the department and was demoted as a result. Following this event, she moved to London in 1954 so as to study textile design and printing at the Regent Street Polytechnic (now, the University of Westminster). During this time, she obtained a pass in 1955 for the hand embroidery course at the City and Guilds of London Institute. In the summer term competition of the School of Art, she won a prize for textile design in 1955 and for fabric design & printing in 1956. She completed her diploma in 1956. After working for a year at a graphic studio in Stuttgart, Germany, Nelly returned home in 1957.

She first met Marianne Strengell, Artist-in-Residence and Head of Weaving at Cranbrook Academy of Art, at a hotel in Mumbai. According to Strengell, Sethna had arranged a meeting with a sample of her work. With Strengell's support, Nelly received the Ellen Booth Scripps Award to study weaving at Cranbrook in 1958–59. Under the apprenticeship of Strengell, Nelly learned to create ‘self-made’ products which were based on the principles of the Nordic sloyd system. Her training involved experimentation with several techniques and put an emphasis on problem solving. Sethna continued to correspond with Strengell in the subsequent years, during which she expressed her gratitude about the opportunity to study at the academy. Strengell had, thus, become her lifelong mentor.

== Career and influences ==
After Sethna's arrival in India in 1957, Neville Wadia invited her to join the first textile design studio at Bombay Dyeing. She had then moved to Cranbrook in 1958. During her time at the academy, she taught art to children and gave speeches at community events. Upon returning to India, Sethna was promoted to head of the design studio at Bombay Dyeing and Manufacturing. Overall, she served as the chief textile designer for Bombay Dyeing from 1957 to 1958 and then from 1960 to 1968.

=== Establishing the Textile Department at NID ===
In 1966, Sethna was invited to Ahmedabad by Gira Sarabhai, the co-founder of the National Institute of Design (NID). The latter acted as a consultant to establish a textile design program which "combined design training in weaving and printing, in crafts as well as mass production technologies." With her friend from Cranbrook, the Finnish textile designer Helena Perheentupa, Sethna had laid the foundation of what is now known as the Textile Design Department at NID.

=== Commercial works ===
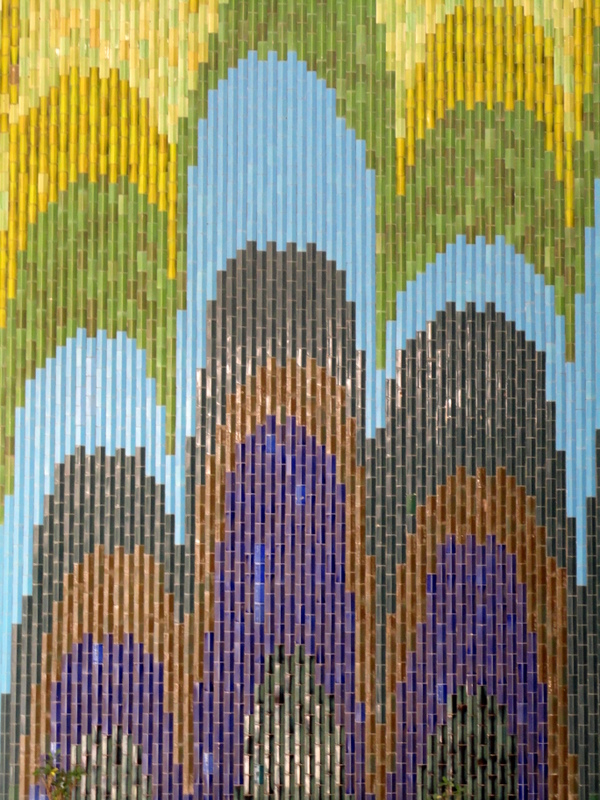
Closeup of a mural by Sethna at Express Towers in Mumbai

During her lifetime, Sethna had received design commissions from the Indian Pavilion at the Expo '70 World's Fair, Indian government, and Air India’s headquarters in Mumbai. Her other commercial works include a three-storey tall wall-hanging in the stairwell of the Ford Foundation in Delhi, tapestries at Godrej Bhavan in Mumbai, and ceramic murals for the lobby of Express Towers in Mumbai, a building designed by Joseph Allen Stein.

=== Revival of Kalamkari ===
Sometime around in 1970, Sethna had visited Masulipatnam to view the Kalamkari textiles being produced there. She found that the present works lacked the exquisite quality of the pieces produced in the ancient tradition. With the support of the Homi Bhabha Fellowship, Sethna set out to rejuvenate the industry. Between 1972 and 1974, she conducted extensive research about the dwindling art of Kalamkari at Srikalahasti and Masulipatnam.

Sethna played an instrumental role in the revival of this craft by creating new design layouts that appealed to the contemporary audience. She also unearthed beautiful hand-carved traditional kalamkari blocks that had fallen into disuse. Further, she helped the craftspeople exhibit widely and wrote about their practices in her book Kalamkari: Painted & Printed Fabrics from Andhra Pradesh (1985).

== Exhibitions ==
- 2013 - No Parsi is An island, National Gallery of Modern Art, Mumbai; Curated by Pheroza Godrej, Firoza Mistree, Ranjit Hoskote and Nancy Adajania.
- 2021 - The Unpaved, Crusty, Earthy Road | Nelly Sethna: A Retrospective, Chatterjee & Lal, Mumbai; Curated by Nancy Adajania.

== Awards ==
In 1985, Sethna was awarded the Padma Shri by the Indian government for her contributions to trade and industry.

== Bibliography ==
- Sethna, N. H. (1973). Shāl: Weaves and Embroideries of Kashmir. India: Wiley Eastern.
- Sethna, N. H. (1985). Kalamkari: Painted & Printed Fabrics from Andhra Pradesh. United States: Mapin International.
