= Vineeta =

Vineeta may refer to:

- Vineeta Bal, Indian scientist at National Institute of Immunology, India
- Vineeta Rai, Indian former civil servant
- Vineeta Rastogi (1968-1995), American AIDS activist, public health worker and Peace Corps Volunteer
- Vineeta Rishi (born 1981), English actress
- Vineeta Singh (born 1983), Indian entrepreneur and CEO, co-founder of Sugar Cosmetics

== See also ==
- Vinita (disambiguation)
