= Vinita =

Vinita may refer to:

== People ==
- Vinita Bali (born 1955), Indian businesswoman, Managing Director of Britannia Industries
- Vinita Gupta (born 1969), Indian-born American businesswoman, founder of Digital Link Corporation
- Vinita Joshi, Indian television actress
- Vinita Nair (born 1981), American television journalist
- Vinita Vasu (born 1975), Indian artist
- Vinita Tunga, a ruler of Odisha

== Places ==
- Ayodhya, also known as Vinita, an Indian city in Uttar Pradesh
- Vinita, Oklahoma, an American city in Craig County
- Vinita Formation, a geological formation in Coquimbo, Chile
- Vinita Park, Missouri, an American city in St. Louis County
- Vinita Terrace, Missouri, an American village in St. Louis County

== See also ==
- Binita, alternative form of the Indian given name
- Vineet, masculine form of the Indian given name
- Vinitha, an Indian writer
- Vinitha Koshy, an Indian actress
- Vineeta (disambiguation)
- Vanitha (disambiguation)
