= Vanitha (disambiguation) =

Vanitha is an Indian magazine. It may also refer to:

People

- Vanitha Krishnachandran, an Indian actress and comedienne in Malayalam, Tamil, Kannada, and Telugu cinema
- Vanitha Vijayakumar, an Indian actress in Tamil cinema
- Vanitha Rangaraju, an Indian animator who works for DreamWorks Animation

== See also ==
- Vinita (disambiguation)
- Vanita, an Indian feminine given name
- Wanita, song by Al Sherman and Sam Coslow
