= D. Udaya Kumar =

Indian academic and designer (born 1978)

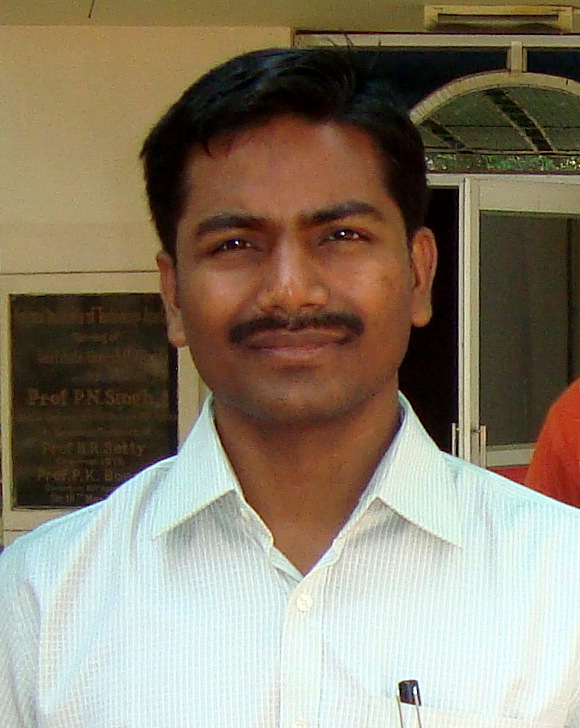
- Udaya Kumar in April 2012
- Born: 1978 (age 47–48); Kallakurichi, Tamil Nadu, India
- Education: IDC, IIT Bombay (PhD); IDC, IIT Bombay (MDes); Anna University (SAP, Chennai) (BArch)
- Occupations: Professor, IIT Guwahati
- Known for: The designer of the Indian rupee sign (2010)
- Notable work: Indian rupee sign
- Father: N. Dharmalingam

Udaya Kumar Dharmalingam is an Indian academic and designer noted for his design of the Indian rupee sign. His design was selected from among five short listed symbols. According to Kumar, the design is based on the Indian tricolour.

As of September 2025, he is a Professor in the Department of Design at IIT Guwahati, Assam.

== Personal life ==
A native of Tamil Nadu, Kumar was born in Marur near Tiruvannamalai and raised in North Chennai. He is the son of N. Dharmalingam, who was a member of the Legislative Assembly of Tamil Nadu from 1971 to 1976.

== Academics ==
Kumar attended La Chatelaine Junior College in Chennai. He obtained a bachelor's degree in architecture (BArch) from the School of Architecture and Planning (SAP) at Anna University, Chennai in 2001. Subsequently he received his master's degree, an MDes in Visual Communication, from the Industrial Design Centre (IDC) of IIT Bombay in 2003. He also did his doctoral studies at the IDC, receiving his PhD in 2010.

== Research ==
The rupee symbol

His areas of interest include graphic design, typography, type design and design research with special focus on Tamil typography (the subject of his doctoral research).

He has also designed a Tamil font named "Parashakti" as a mini project at the IDC, under the guidance of Prof. G. V. Sreekumar, who is one of the few font experts in the country. During his MDes project he wrote and designed a book on Tamil typography, which is the first attempt at bringing such a subject to a Tamil audience. In this book, Kumar also created new Tamil terminology for many typographic terms where English words were used.

Kumar also provided guidance for the designing of the official mascot for the 49th Inter IIT Sports Meet.

Kumar conceptualised the design for Rupee symbol for Indian currency. The symbol is created using the Devanagari letter र 'Ra' and Roman capital letter 'R'. The letters are derived from the word Rupiah in Hindi and Rupees in English, so the symbol is meaningful to both Indians and international users. It also uses the Shirorekha, the horizontal top line which is unique to Indian Devanagari script. The two horizontal lines form an "equals" sign, which also evokes the tri-color Indian flag. Ambika Soni approved the new rupee symbol on 15 July 2010. Udaya Kumar was awarded prize money of ₹250,000 for his efforts.
