= Nidd (disambiguation) =

Nidd is a village in Yorkshire, England.

Nidd may also refer to:

- River Nidd, a tributary of the River Ouse, Yorkshire
- Níð, an Old German term referring to a loss of honour
- Mornington Crescent (game) uses Nidd as a place of punishment and purgatory if a poor move is made
- Noninsulin-dependent diabetes (NIDD) – Type 2 diabetes
- SS Nidd, British freight ship, early 20th century
- Fred Nidd (1869–1956), English footballer
- Niddesa, a Buddhist scripture

== See also ==
- Nid (disambiguation)
