= Industrial Policy Resolution of 1956 =

Resolution of Indian National Congress

Industrial Policy Resolution of 1956 (IPR 1956) is a resolution adopted by the Indian parliament in April 1956. It was the second comprehensive statement on industrial development of India after the Industrial Policy of 1948. The 1956 policy continued to constitute the basic economic policy for a long time. This fact has been confirmed in all the Five-Year Plans of India. According to this resolution the objective of the social and economic policy in India was the establishment of a socialistic pattern of society. It provided more powers to the governmental machinery. It laid down three categories of industries which were more sharply defined. These categories were:

1. Schedule A: those industries which were to be an exclusive responsibility of the state.
2. Schedule B: those which were to be progressively state-owned and in which the state would generally set up new enterprises, but in which private enterprise would be expected only to supplement the effort of the state; and
3. Schedule C: all the remaining industries and their future development would, in general be left to the initiative and enterprise of the private sector.

Schedule A Industries:

1. Arms and ammunition and allied items of defence equipment
2. Atomic energy
3. Iron and Steel
4. Heavy castings and forgings of iron and steel
5. Heavy plant and machinery required for iron and steel production, for mining, for machine tool manufacture and for such other basic industries as may be specified by the Central Government
6. Heavy electrical plant including large hydraulic and steam turbines
7. Coal and lignite
8. Mineral oils
9. Mining of iron ore, manganese ore, chrome-ore, gypsum, sulphur, gold and diamond
10. Mining and processing of copper, lead, zinc, tin, molybdenum and wolfram
11. Minerals specified in the Schedule to the Atomic Energy (Control of Production and Use) Order, 1953
12. Aircraft
13. Air transport
14. Railway Transport
15. Ship Building
16. Telephones and telephone cables, telegraph and wireless apparatus (excluding radio receiving sets)
17. Generation and distribution of electricity

Although there was a category of industries left to the private sector (Schedule C above), the sector was kept under state control through a system of licenses. In order to open new industry or to expand production, obtaining a license from the government was a prerequisite. Opening new industries in economically backward areas was incentivised through easy licensing and subsidization of critical inputs like electricity and water. This was done to counter regional disparities that existed in the country. Licenses to increase the production were issued only if the government was convinced that the economy required more of the goods.

Fair and non-discriminatory treatment for the private sector, encouragement to village and small-scale enterprises, removing regional disparities, and the need for the provision of amenities for labor, and attitude to foreign capital were other salient features of the IPR 1956.

The Industrial Policy of 1956 is known as the economic constitution of the country.
