= IDC School of Design =

Design school of the Indian Institute of Technology Bombay

IDC School of Design (Indian Institute of Technology Bombay)
- आई.डी.सी. अभिकल्प विद्यालय
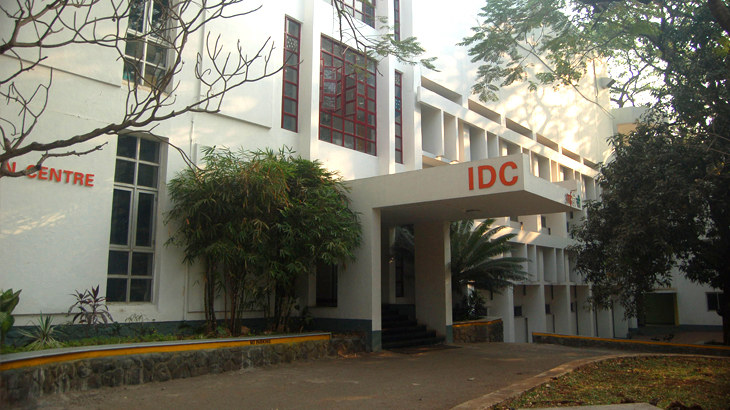
- Type: Public
- Established: 1969
- Head: Anirudha Joshi
- Faculty: 27
- Undergraduates: 120
- Postgraduates: 150
- Doctoral students: 45
- Location: Mumbai, India; 19.133408°N 72.917384°E
- Campus: Urban
- Website: www.idc.iitb.ac.in

The IIT Bombay Industrial Design Centre School of Design (IITB IDC School of Design) is a design school part of the Indian Institute of Technology Bombay, a public research university in Powai, Mumbai. It offers four-year Bachelor of Design (B.Des.) and two-year Master of Design (M.Des.) programmes, a five-year integrated Bachelor's plus Master's in design programme, and doctoral programmes (PhD) in design across various disciplines such as industrial design, communication design, animation and automobile design.

== Notable faculty ==
- Prof. R. K. Joshi
- Prof. Ravi Poovaiah
- Prof. Shilpa Ranade
- Prof. Nina Sabnani

== Notable alumni ==
- Pranav Mistry - inventor of 6th sense and Global Vice President of Research at Samsung
- Satyendra Pakhale - of Pakhale Associates
- Udaya Kumar - designer of the Indian rupee sign
- Ramkripa Ananthan - Designer of Mahindra Bolero, Thar, XUVs, Jeep
- Krishand- Director
