= Helena Perheentupa =

Finnish designer (1929–2019)

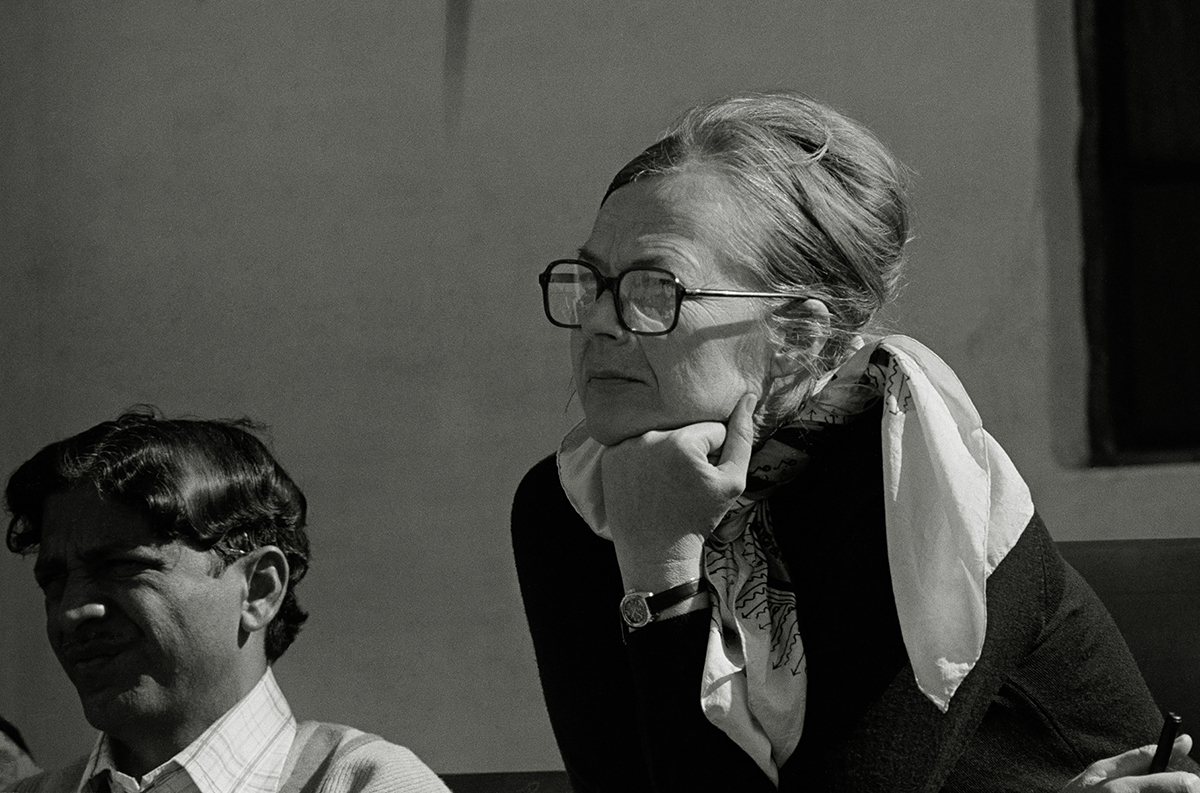
- Born: 26 June 1929; Loimaa, Finland
- Died: 6 February 2019 (aged 89); Helsinki, Finland
- Education: Cranbrook Academy of Art, Hämeenlinna Co-educational School, School of Art and Design
- Occupations: Textile designer, educator
- Employer: Finlayson Forssa Factory
- Organization: National Institute of Design
- Known for: Textile design, development
- Movement: Modernism

Helena Perheentupa was a Finnish-born designer and teacher, known for textile design. She spent a major part of her time establishing the textile design department at the National Institute of Design in India. Perheentupa arrived in Ahmedabad, India in August 1968, and returned to Finland in 1992.

== Early life and education ==
Perheentupa was born in Loimaa Finland. She studied at the Cranbrook Academy of Art in the United States, majoring in the fiber arts under the guidance of Marianne Strengell, and graduated in 1960. During her time in India, Perheentupa collected handicrafts, that she showed to the Finnish public during numerous public exhibitions.

== Career ==
=== Marimekko ===
Before moving to India, Perheentupa was a part of the in-house design team at Marimekko.

=== Textile department at NID ===
On the advice of her friend Nelly Sethna, Helena agreed to come to India. In a telegram message, Sethna wrote, “Will you come to India? There are camels on the streets and women carrying so many pots on their heads!” Perheentupa arrived in Ahmedabad in August 1968 to established the Textile Design Department at NID. Perheentupa was the first to institutionalise a Textile Design Programme in India. Her primary responsibility was setting up and managing the training programme. She selected students who would be taught textile design and simultaneously trained to become future teachers in the field. She was a mentor and a colleague to designers like Aditi Ranjan, Madhurima Patni, Krishna Amin Patel, Nilam Iyer and many more.

During her tenure at NID, many Indian crafts were documented under her guidance. Perheentupa used the idea of design as intervention in complex situations like generating livelihood, and to rethink systems and services with consideration of developmental goals. She initiated student projects at the local jail where inmates were taught vocational skills. She worked with the street sweepers to create masks to protect them from dust and smoke. Helena headed a range of craft projects including 'Design studio for Ashoka & Raipur mills, Ahmedabad' and 'Toran: textiles from Western India'. For a while, Perheentupa also headed NID's Design Cell at Delhi and at Bangalore. She became an important figure in the contemporary textile and design practise in India.

=== Jawaja Project ===
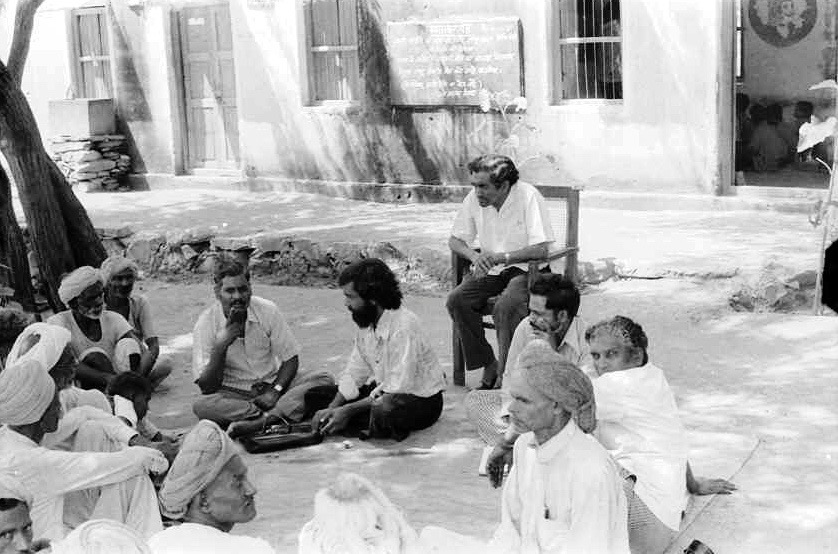
Ravi Matthai (on the chair) and Raaj Sah (with beard and long hair) with villagers in Jawaja, 1975

Along with Ravi J Matthai, Nilam Iyer, and Ravi Kaur, Perheentupa was instrumental in setting up the Jawaja experiment in 1975, to empower leather workers and weavers in the impoverished regions of the Jawaja block in, Rajasthan.

== Published works ==
- Tangail Sarees of Bengal, with Pallab Chandra Rana, National Institute of Design · 1992
- Weavers of Jawaja with Ravi Goswami, National Institute of Design · 1992
- TORAN: Textiles from Western India, Helsinki · 1997
