= Ramkripa Ananthan =

Indian car designer

Ramkripa Ananthan (born 1971) is an Indian car designer, and is head of design at Ola Electric. Ram Kripa Ananthan was born to Ms. Ananthan, a respected educationist known for her dedicated service in the field of school education. She worked for many years at Jeevana School, one of the leading educational institutions in Madurai, where she played a significant role in shaping academic policies and nurturing young minds.

== Career ==
Ananthan studied Mechanical Engineering at BITS Pilani and is a graduate from IDC School of Design and IIT Bombay. She joined Mahindra & Mahindra as an interior designer in 1997, working on the interiors of the Bolero, Scorpio and the Xylo cars.

In 2022 she left Mahindra & Mahindra to set up her own company Krux Studio and worked for Ola Electric as head of design.

== Notable designs ==
Ananthan has led the teams on the designs for a number of Mahindra vehicles including:

- Mahindra TUV300
- Mahindra XUV500
- Mahindra XUV300
- Mahindra Marazzo
- Mahindra KUV100
- Mahindra XUV700
- Mahindra Thar
- Mahindra Thar Roxx
