= Nina Sabnani =

Indian filmmaker (born 1956)

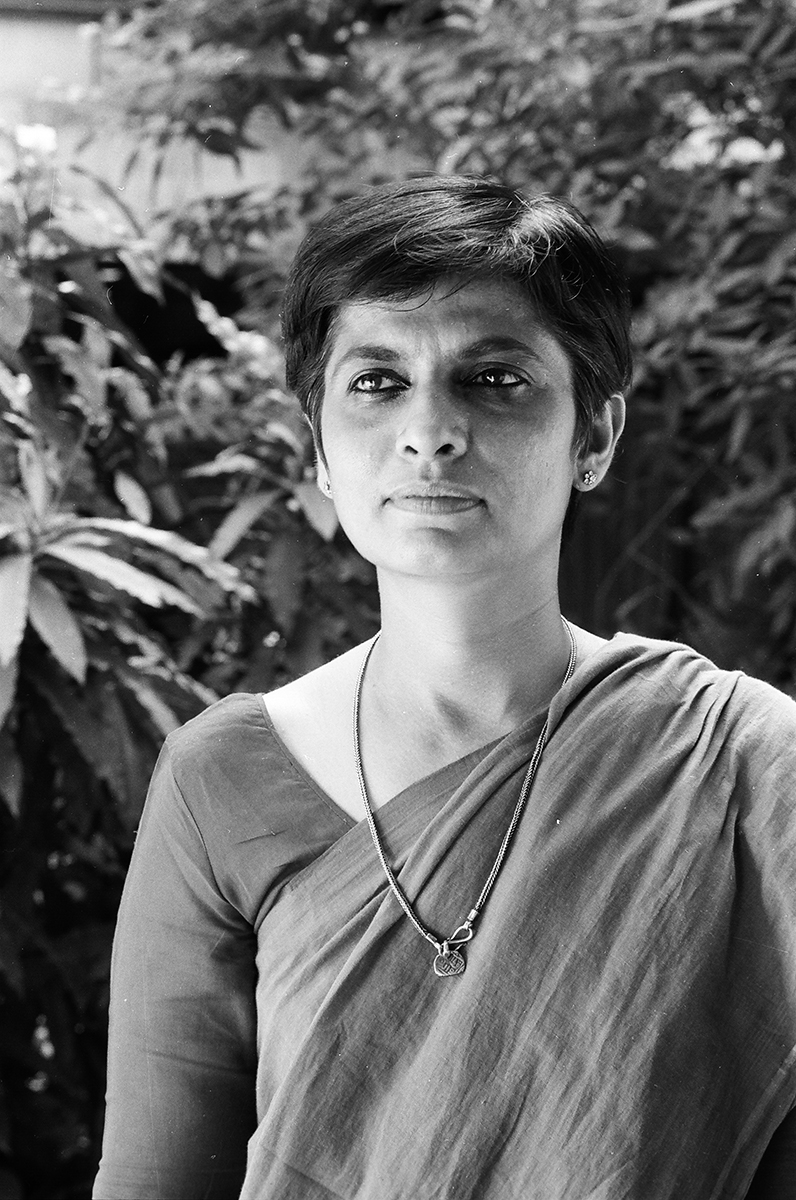
- Nina Sabnani at National Institute of Design, Ahmedabad
- Born: 1956 (age 69–70); Ahmedabad, Gujarat
- Education: National Institute of Design, Syracuse University
- Known for: Animation, Illustration
- Awards: Rajat Kamal Award

Nina Sabnani (born 1956) is an Indian animation filmmaker, illustrator and an educator. She is known for her films which blend together animation and ethnography. Collaboration with diverse ethnic communities as well as storytelling with words and imagery have been her research interests.

Sabnani has taught for more than two decades at the National Institute of Design (NID), Ahmedabad. Along with Animation Design, Sabnani also served as the coordinator of the New Media Design when it was introduced in 2001 at National Institute of Design. She is currently a professor at the Industrial Design Centre (IDC), IIT Bombay.

== Academic background ==
Sabnani graduated in painting from the Faculty of Fine Arts, MSU, Vadodara and completed a certificate program in animation film making at the NID, Ahmedabad. She received a Fulbright Fellowship in 1997 to purse post-graduate studies in film at Syracuse University, New York. Her doctoral research at the IDC, IIT Bombay was based on Rajasthan's Kaavad storytelling tradition.

== Filmography ==
Year	Title
1982	Drawing! Drawing!
1984	Shubh Vivah
1987	A Summer Story
1988	Badhte Kadam
1989-90	All About Nothing
1990	One Day in Fatehpur Sikri
1994	Patents for Progress
2005	Mukund and Riaz
2009	The Makers of Tales
2009	Tanko Bole Chhe (The Stitches Speak)
2011	Baat Wahi Hai (It's The Same Story)
2012	Bemata
2013	Thank You Many Times
2016	Hum Chitra Banate Hain (We Make Images)

== Bibliography ==
- Sabnani, Nina. Stitching Stories: The Art of Embroidery in Gujarat. India, Tulika Publishers, 2011.
- Sabnani, Nina. Kaavad Tradition of Rajasthan: A Portable Pilgrimage. India, Niyogi Books, 2014.

== Awards ==
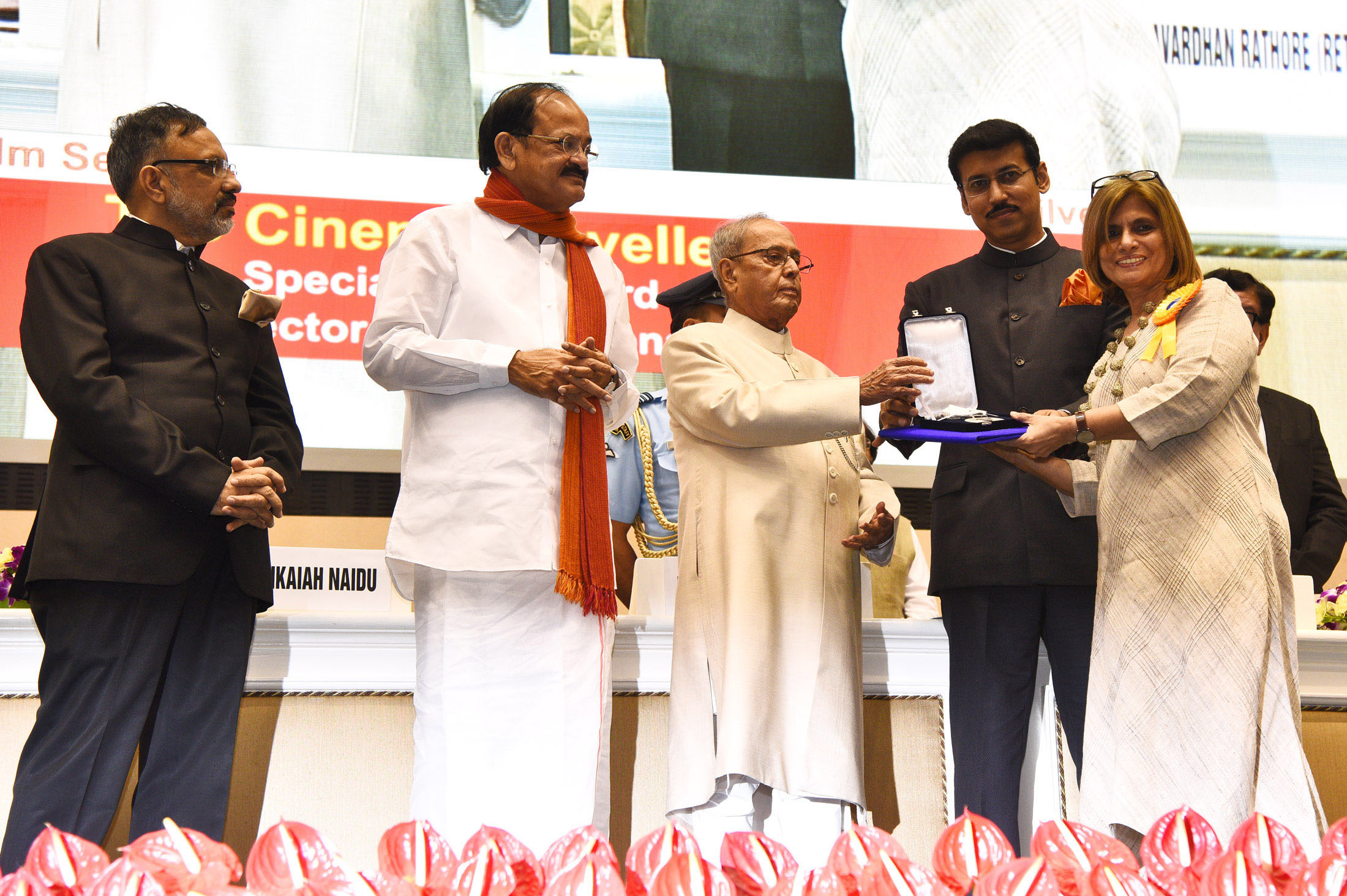
Nina Sabnani receiving Rajat Kamal Award from President Pranab Mukherjee

- 2017 - Rajat Kamal Award for Best Animation in the film Hum Chitra Banate Hai, in Non-Feature Film Section.
- 2018 - Lifetime Achievement Award for Illustration by Tata Trusts at Tata Lit Live, Mumbai
