= Indian rupee sign =

Currency symbol for the Indian Rupee (INR)

₹

Indian rupee sign
- In Unicode: U+20B9 ₹ INDIAN RUPEE SIGN

Currency
- Currency: Indian rupee

Related
- See also: U+20A8 ₨ RUPEE SIGN (Sri Lanka, Pakistan and Nepal)

The Indian rupee sign (₹) is the currency symbol for the Indian rupee (ISO 4217: INR), the official currency of India. The sign was designed by D. Udaya Kumar, an Indian academic and designer.

The sign was first presented to the public by the Government of India on 15 July 2010, following its selection through an open competition among Indian residents. At that point, the sign had not yet been adopted, but the government had officially announced that it would be adopted by the end of 2010. The sign was adopted by the Unicode Consortium and was given a codepoint (U+20B9) in Unicode with the coming of version 6.0 on 12 October 2010, making it usable worldwide as soon as computer fonts which included that were installed. After the introduction of Unicode 6.0, books, bank cheques, and many types of official government documents began using the new symbol, marking the official and true adoption of the Indian rupee sign. On 28 February 2011, Finance Minister Pranab Mukherjee, in his speech, introduced the incorporation of the symbol on physical currency. Until the new sign came fully into use, the Indian rupee was commonly signified using the abbreviation Rs, a notation shared with several other countries. In texts written in Indian languages, an appropriate abbreviation in the respective language was also used; for example, in Hindi it was abbreviated as रु.

The design is based on the Devanagari letter (र) (ra) with a double horizontal line at the top and the Latin capital letter (R) without its vertical bar.

== Origin ==
On 5 March 2009, the Indian government announced a contest to create a sign for the Indian rupee. During the 2010 Union Budget, then Union Finance Minister Pranab Mukherjee said that the proposed sign should reflect and capture the Indian ethos and culture. From around 3,331 responses received, five symbols were shortlisted. These were the entries from Nondita Correa-Mehrotra, Hitesh Padmashali, Shibin KK, Shahrukh J. Irani, and D. Udaya Kumar: one of them was due to be selected at the Union Council of Ministers of India meeting held on 24 June 2010. However, the decision was deferred at the request of the Finance Minister, and the final decision was made when they met again on 15 July 2010, when they chose the symbol created by D. Udaya Kumar, Associate Professor at IIT Guwahati. Although this rupee symbol was selected as the winner at that time, it was targeted to be officially adopted within six months, around the end of 2010. The symbol was adopted and released on 12 October 2010, in Unicode 6.0 by the Unicode Consortium. From that point on, depending on when the computer fonts used received the new symbol, many government documents, bank cheques, bank records, bills, computer keyboards, etc., began to use the new symbol in place of the traditional ₨.

== Design ==
Indian rupee symbol in graphic form

The new sign is a combination of the Devanagari letter 'ra', र, and the Latin capital letter R, R without its vertical bar. The parallel lines at the top (with white space between them) makes an allusion to the tricolour Indian flag and an "equality sign" (the equals sign) that symbolizes a balanced economy.

The final selected symbol was designed by D. Udaya Kumar, a Bachelor of Architecture and (at the time) a visual design student at the Industrial Design Centre, IIT Bombay. The thoughts and philosophy behind the design are explained in his proposal document.

== Approval ==
The Ministry of Finance and Department of Economic Affairs of the Government of India approved the sign. The approval was given by Sushil Kumar, Under Secretary of the Government of India in 2010.

== Usage ==
Two-rupee coin with the rupee sign at the top.

Upon the symbol's selection on 15 July 2010, the Indian government said it would try to adopt the sign within six months in the country and globally within 18 to 24 months. On 12 October 2010, Unicode version 6.0, which included the Indian rupee sign (₹), was released. From then onwards, as computer operating systems and computer fonts were updated to recognise it, the major banks started using the new Indian rupee sign, replacing the traditional (Rs) in their documents, cheques and bills, and replacing (रु) in their Hindi documents. These updates also enabled the citizens of the country to use the sign, digitally which had not been possible before. The inclusion of the Indian rupee sign (₹) in official documents marked its adoption in the country as well worldwide, beginning on 12 October 2010, when its usage in official texts actually started, following the release of Unicode 6.0, on the same day. One of the oldest official government documents using the rupee sign dates back to 8 December 2010, issued by the Reserve Bank of India, and features the then-upcoming new design ₹5 coin based on the theme 'Birth Centenary of Mother Teresa.' On 8 July 2011, coins of denomination of ₹1, ₹2, ₹5, and ₹10 with the new rupee symbol have been put into circulation, marking its adoption in the physical currency for the first time.

The Indian Postal Department printed postage stamps once with this new Indian rupee sign, when it issued the Commonwealth Games commemorative stamps on 3 October 2010. Though it was only once, the next stamps, which were launched on 6 October 2010 based on the theme "Princely States", were issued again without the rupee sign and since then, as of 2025, the rupee sign has never been used on postage stamps. Thus, this remained merely an attempt to begin the adoption of the sign rather than a real adoption, as the next series of stamps were again issued without the rupee sign.

In his budget speech on 28 February 2011, the finance minister, Pranab Mukherjee, announced that the sign would be incorporated in future coin issues. The sign was adopted into the banknotes gradually rather than all at once. The introduction of the sign on various denominations of bank notes occurred on the following dates:

1. ₹10 note: 23 September 2011
2. ₹20 and ₹50 notes: 12 April 2012
3. ₹100 note: 22 November 2011
4. ₹500 note: 26 December 2011
5. ₹1000 note: 18 November 2011

== Unicode and keyboard entry ==
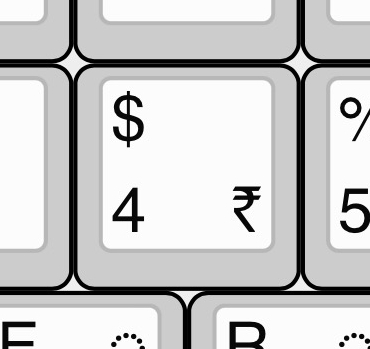
Keytop showing 4/$/₹ key.

On 10 August 2010, the Unicode Technical Committee accepted the proposed code position U+20B9 ₹ INDIAN RUPEE SIGN. The character has been encoded in Unicode 6.0, which was released on 12 October 2010, and named distinctly from the existing character U+20A8 ₨ RUPEE SIGN, which continues to be available as the generic rupee sign.

Ubuntu became the first operating system to support the Indian rupee symbol by default in 2010. Since its 10.10 version it has supported the symbol out-of-the-box, as it was added to the Ubuntu font family by a contributor. Since then, it has been included in various Linux distributions. On systems running Ubuntu, most other Linux distributions and ChromeOS, the symbol may be typed using Ctrl+⇧ Shift+u 20B9Space (or simply AltGr+4 if the 'English (India)' language setting is used).

On 18 May 2011, Microsoft released an update KB2496898 to Windows Vista, Windows Server 2008, Windows 7 and Windows Server 2008 R2 operating systems to include support for this new Indian rupee symbol. With the Windows update, it is now possible to use alt code text entry to obtain the Indian Rupee symbol: Alt+8377. On systems running Windows 8 or later, the symbol can be typed using the 'English (India)' keyboard layout with the key combination AltGr+4 (or Ctrl+Alt+4 or Ctrl+⇧ Shift+4). Modern keyboards for the Indian market have the symbol engraved on the 4 key as an alternate graphic.

Apple Inc. has added support for the rupee symbol with iOS 7 in 2013. Mac OS X Lion (10.7) also includes the new Indian rupee symbol, which can be found in the Character Viewer. As of Mac OS X Mountain Lion (10.8), users using the Devanagari keyboard can enter the new Indian rupee symbol by typing ⌥ Option-4 (a combination that yields the cent symbol on a US keyboard layout).

Sailfish OS also provides the symbol in its default keyboard.

== Symbol for paisa ==
Proposed symbol for paisa

A symbol for the paisa, based on the same design concept as the Indian rupee sign was proposed following the public presentation of the rupee symbol, however, it was never officially used, as the paisa currency was announced to be withdrawn soon on 20 December 2010. Following the demonetization of the paisa currency on 30 June 2011, the Reserve Bank of India ceased the circulation and minting of paisa coins. The proposed symbol was never used on any coins.

== Controversy ==
The Indian rupee sign selection process was challenged in the Delhi High Court, by petitioner Rakesh Kumar, who was a participant in the competition, described the process as "full of discrepancies" and "flawed", and named the Finance Ministry and the chairman of Indian Rupee Symbol Selection Committee as respondents. On 26 November 2010, the Delhi High Court single bench dismissed the writ petition, stating there was no justifiable ground for the stated allegations.

However, later the Delhi High Court, on 30 January 2013, in W.P. (c) 2449/2012 titled Rakesh Kumar Singh Vs. Union of India (PIL) and listed before the Division bench of the Chief Justice and Mr. Justice V. K. Jain, taking cognizance of and in view of the irregularities and arbitrariness involved in public competitions for designing symbols or logos or designing logos by other methods of important national bodies or institutions, in their judgment directed all the ministries of the Government of India to formulate or prepare guidelines to ensure transparency, wider participation of public and also that such guidelines should be of uniform nature and in uniformity with each others.

On 11 April 2013, the Finance Ministry formed the guidelines for conducting public competitions for design of symbol or logo.

In the logo for the 2025-26 Tamil Nadu state budget, the rupee symbol '₹', used in previous years, was replaced with the Tamil letter 'ரூ' (pronounced 'Roo'), representing 'Roobai,' the Tamil term for rupee. This decision received mixed results from political figures and parties.

== Codepoint comparison ==
- U+20B9 ₹ INDIAN RUPEE SIGN (encoded on 12 October 2010)
- U+20A8 ₨ RUPEE SIGN (other rupees) (encoded in June 1993)

== See also ==
- Currency symbol
- Rupee sign
