= Aditi Ranjan =

Indian designer and educator

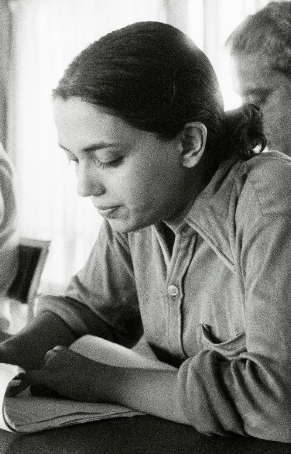
- Aditi Ranjan (née Shirali) at National Institute of Design, Ahmedabad in 1977
- Born: Aditi Shirali; 25 February 1952 (age 74)
- Education: National Institute of Design, Ahmedabad
- Occupations: Textile designer; author; design educator
- Organization: National Institute of Design, Ahmedabad
- Known for: Textile design education
- Notable work: Handmade in India; Textile and Bamboo Crafts of the Northeastern Region
- Spouse: M. P. Ranjan (m. 1981; died 2015)
- Awards: Kamala Samman Award with M. P. Ranjan

Aditi Ranjan (née Shirali; born 25 February 1952) is an Indian textile designer, educator and researcher involved in the field of Indian crafts. She taught textile design at the National Institute of Design, Ahmedabad from 1974 to 2012. Ranjan is known for her book Handmade in India: A Geographic Encyclopedia of Indian Handicrafts based on Indian arts & crafts that she edited along with her partner and fellow design pedagogue, M. P. Ranjan.

== Work ==
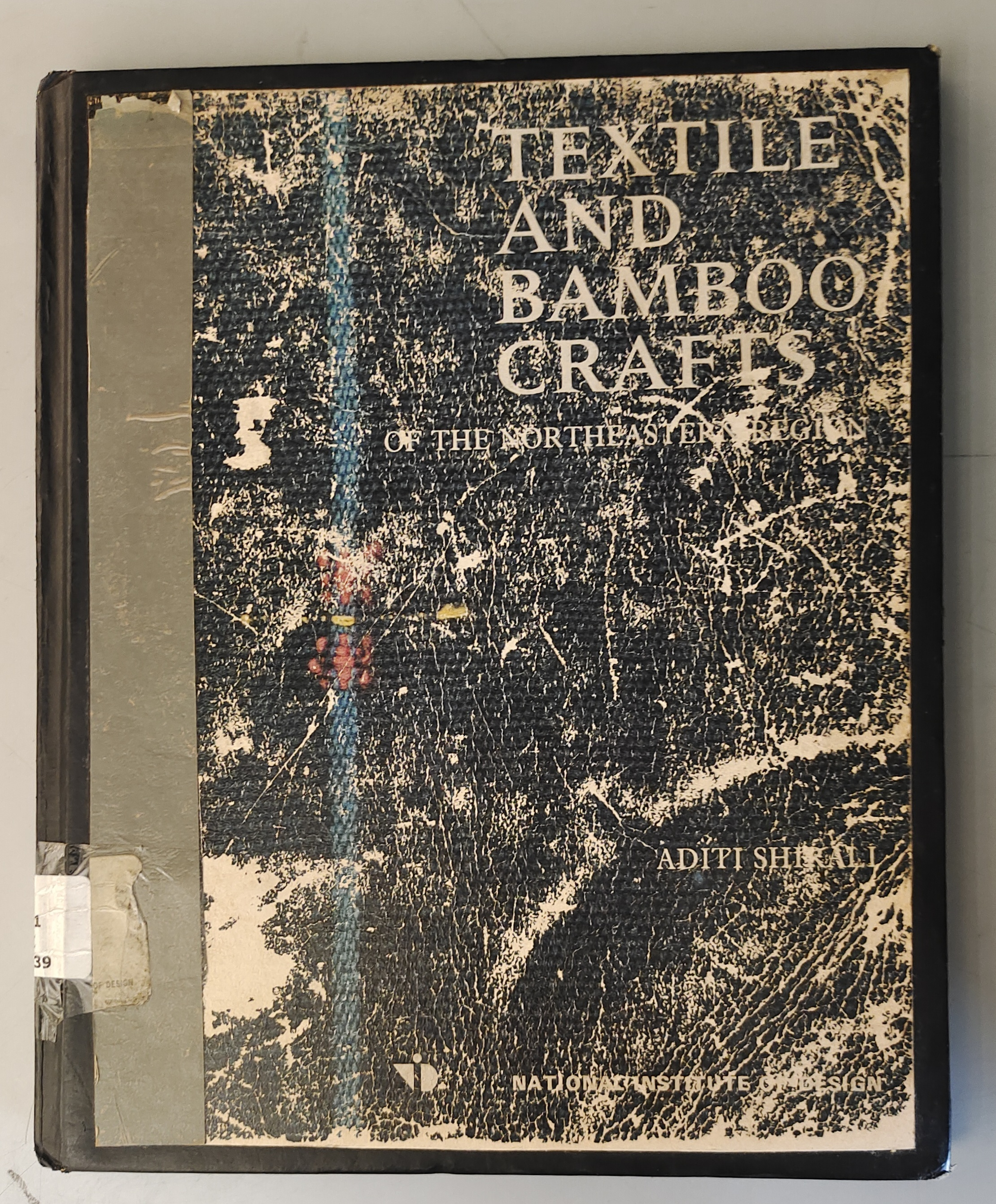
Front cover of Textile and Bamboo Crafts of the Northeastern Region (1983) by Aditi (née Shirali) Ranjan. Published by NID.

She is involved in the study of weave structure and fabric construction. She also documents and researches on textiles, crafts, and the diverse material and visual culture of India. Some of her notable works include:

- Textile and Bamboo Crafts of the Northeastern Region (1983)
- Chikankari Embroidery of Lucknow (1992) with Ashok Rai
- Navalgund Durries of Karnataka (1992) with Chandrashekar Bheda
- Handmade in India: A Geographic Encyclopedia of Indian Handicrafts (2009) with her husband M. P. Ranjan.

Aditi Ranjan has been an educator in the discipline of textile design at the National Institute of Design, Ahmedabad since 1972. From 2011 to 2016, she was engaged in a research project on the textile traditions of the North-east India, with the support of the Outreach Programmes at National Institute of Design, Ahmedabad and commissioned by the Indira Gandhi National Centre for the Arts (IGNCA), Delhi.

Ranjan has also curated a private collection of saris and shawls for the textile gallery, the Ahmedabad Trunk at the House of MG, a heritage resort in Ahmedabad. Art of the loom, an exhibition put up in 2019 at the Ahmedabad trunk, was a notable curatorial work by her. This exhibition showcased handloom textiles from the personal collection of Leena Sarabhai Mangaldas and Anjali Mangaldas.

=== Handmade in India ===
The book was written from 2002 to 2007. It offers a detailed documentation of India’s art and craft traditions. The project was conceptualised by the Ranjan duo and involved extensive fieldwork across the country. The book is an official directory of all the crafts and was published by the Department of Handicrafts, Ministry of Textiles and the Government of India. Aditi and M. P. Ranjan were honoured with the Kamala Samman Award in 2014 for the book.

== See also ==
- Channapatna toys
- M. P. Ranjan
- Helena Perheentupa
