= Chandralekha (dancer) =

Indian dancer and choreographer (1928–2006)

- Born: 6 December 1928; Vada, Bombay Presidency, British India
- Died: 30 December 2006 (aged 78); Chennai, India

Chandralekha Prabhudas Patel (6 December 1928 – 30 December 2006), commonly known as Chandralekha, was a dancer and choreographer from India. The niece of Vallabhbhai Patel, India's first deputy Prime Minister, she was an exponent of performances fusing Bharatanatyam with Yoga and martial arts like Kalarippayattu.

She was conferred the highest award of the Sangeet Natak Akademi, India's National Academy for Music, Dance and Drama, the Sangeet Natak Akademi Fellowship in 2004.

== Early life and education ==
She was born to an agnostic doctor father and a devout Hindu mother in Vada, Maharashtra. She spent her childhood in her native Gujarat and in Maharashtra.

== Career ==
After completing high school, Chandralekha studied law, but quit her studies midway to learn dance instead. She started with Dasi Attam, a form of dance practiced by temple dancers in southern India, under the tutelage of Ellappa Pillai. She was also influenced by Balasaraswati and Rukmini Devi Arundale in her dance education, but her choreography shows that she was more influenced by the former. Although Chandralekha received her early training in Bharatanatyam, she went on to change her focus to postmodern fusion dances that incorporated elements from other dances, martial arts like Kalarippayattu, and performing arts. Her essay 'Militant Origins of Indian Dance', originally published in Social Scientist in 1979, was later reprinted in the volume Improvised Futures: Encountering the Body in Performance, part of the India Since the 90s series published by Tulika Books.

== Awards and recognition ==
- 1991: Sangeet Natak Akademi Award: Creative Dance
- 2003-2004: Kalidas Samman
- 2004: Sangeet Natak Akademi Fellowship

== Bibliography ==
- Rustom Barucha. Chandralekha: Woman, Dance, Resistance. Indus. New Delhi: 1995. ISBN 81-7223-168-7
