= National Institute of Design, Madhya Pradesh =

Design school in Bhopal, India

Coordinates: 26.7415°N 94.2279°E

National Institute of Design, Bhopal
- Type: Institutes of National Importance
- Established: 22 February 2019; 7 years ago
- Chairperson: Joint Secretary, DPIIT, Ministry of Commerce & Industry
- Director: Dr. Vidya Rakesh
- Location: Bhopal, Madhya Pradesh, India
- Campus: Urban
- Website: www.nidmp.ac.in

National Institute of Design, Madhya Pradesh is an autonomous educational institute situated in Bhopal, Madhya Pradesh.

== History ==
National Institute of Design Madhya Pradesh (NID MP) is an autonomous institution under the Department for Promotion of Industry and Internal Trade (DPIIT), Ministry of Commerce and Industry, Govt. of India. NIDMP is also brought under the ambit of NID Act, 2014 through NID (Amendment) Bill, 2019, which has been passed by the Parliament. Hon’ble President has accorded assent to the NID (Amendment) Act, 2019. No 38 of 2019 on 29 November 2019. The corresponding Act has been published in the Gazette of India on 3 December 2019. The said Act has come into force on 13/01/2020 vide a Gazette notification dated 13 January 2020. Under This act NIDMP is eligible to offer Bachelor Degree in Design (B.Des.) and Master Degree in Design (M.Des.) as well as PhD Degree in Design. In early 2007, Department for Promotion of Industry and Internal Trade (erstwhile Department of Industrial Policy and Promotion), Ministry of Commerce and Industry, Govt. of India envisioned the National Design Policy aimed at creating a design-enabled innovation economy and strengthening design education in the country. With design and innovation taking prime importance in many sectors, policies, and schemes of the government such as "Make in India", "Skill India", "Digital India", "Startup India", and "Smart City initiatives" to name a few, it becomes imperative to promote design education to the next level. India needs the skill and expertise of professionally- trained designers to contribute to the national missions announced by Central Government.

== Courses offered ==
NID Madhya Pradesh currently offers full-time four year Bachelor of Design Programme in Design (B.Des) with specialization streams of Industrial Design, Communication Design, and Textile and Apparel Design with an intake capacity of 75 students.

== Campus ==
NID Madhya Pradesh Campus is a green residential campus, located with a hilly backdrop. Facilities like Girls & Boys Hostel, Auditorium, Library, Mess & Cafe etc. are available at the campus.
