= National Institute of Design, Andhra Pradesh =

Design school in Guntur, India

- Type: Autonomous Institution of National Importance
- Established: 2015; 11 years ago
- Chairperson: Joint Secretary, DPIIT, Ministry of Commerce & Industry, Government of India
- Director: Vacant
- Undergraduates: 240
- Location: Amaravati, Andhra Pradesh, India; 16.373354°N 80.526540°E
- Campus: Rural
- Website: nid.ac.in

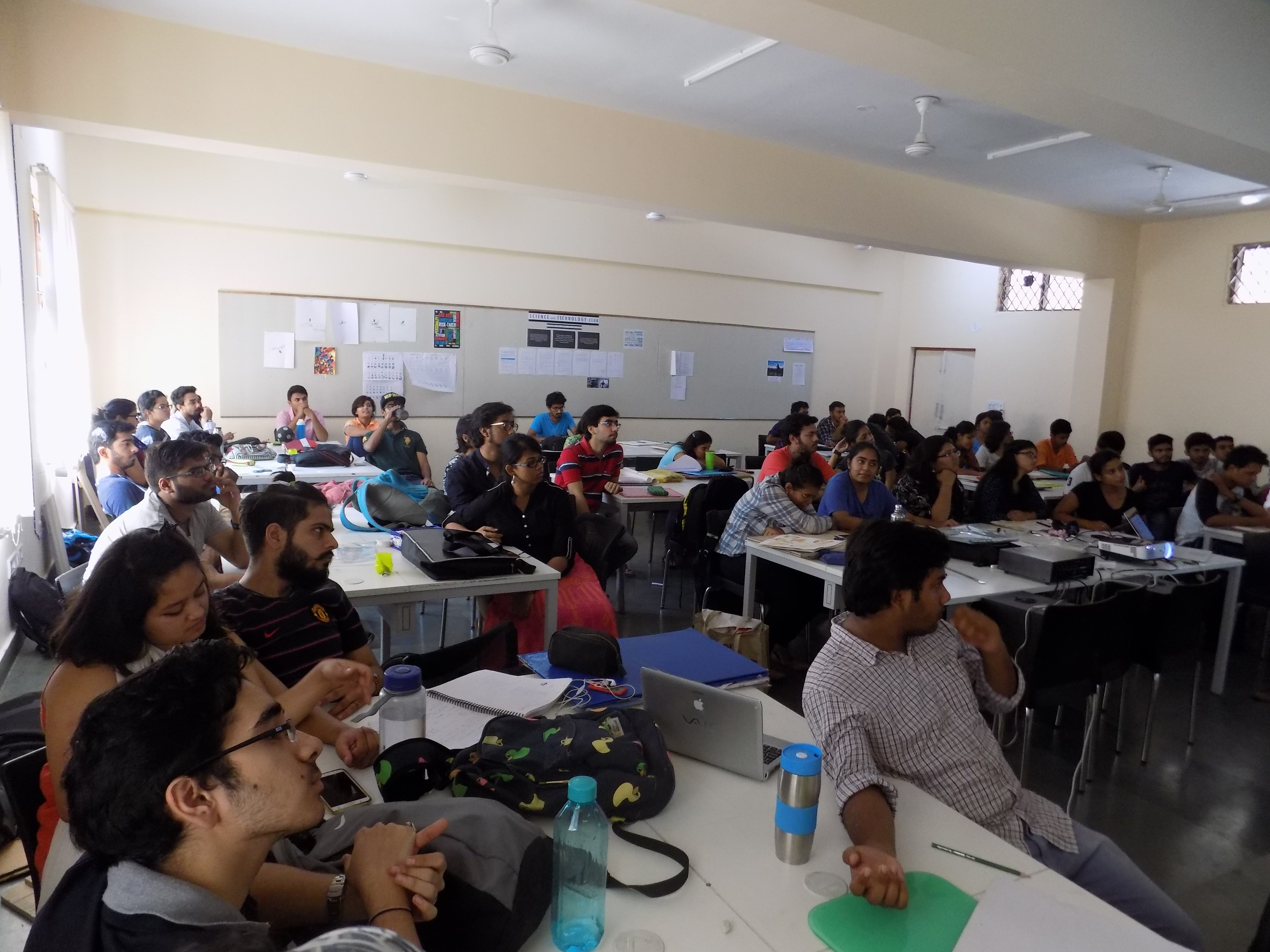

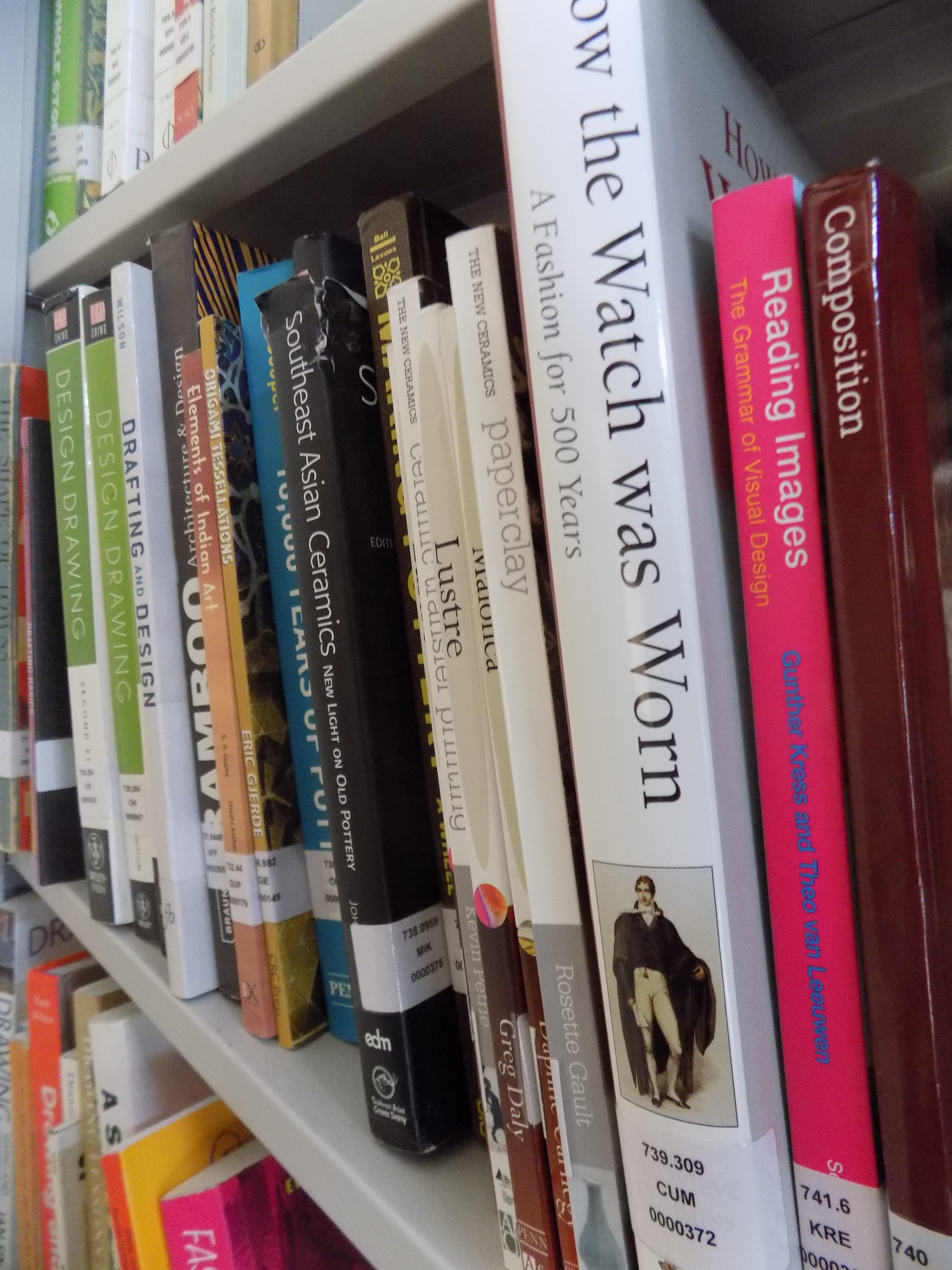
Knowledge Management Centre

National Institute of Design, Andhra Pradesh (NID - AP) - an Institute of National Importance (INI) is a design school in India located at Sakhamuru, Amaravati. It functions as an autonomous body under the Department of Industrial Policy and Promotion, Ministry of Commerce and Industry, Government of India.

== History ==
Established on 7 September 2015, this institute is the second autonomous design institute under the Department for Promotion of Industry and Internal Trade (DPIIT), Ministry of Commerce and Industry, Government of India, in succession to five decades of the National Institute of Design, Ahmedabad.

The creation of four additional NIDs was suggested as part of the central government's 2007 National Design Policy.

Until December 2023, NID AP temporarily ran its four years Bachelor of Design program at Acharya Nagarjuna University on Guntur - Vijayawada highway (NH 16). It was first known as the National Institute of Design, Vijayawada, and later changed to the National Institute of Design, Amaravati. However, it was finally named the National Institute of Design, Andhra Pradesh.

In early 2024, the institute has shifted to its permanent 50-acre (20 ha) campus in Amaravati. (Sakhamuru Village, Thullur Mandal, Guntur District - 522237, Andhra Pradesh, India)

== Courses offered ==
The institute offers Bachelor of Design(B.Des) courses in Industrial Design, Communication Design, Textile and Apparel Design.

=== Bachelor of Design (B.Des) ===
NID Andhra Pradesh offers a four-year Bachelor of Design (B.Des) degree program with three areas of specialisation. As the National Institute of Design Act 2019 was passed, the institute now gives the Bachelor of Design (B.Des) degree instead of the previously offered Graduate Diploma Program in Design (GDPD). NID-AP currently offers Bachelor’s of Design (B.Des) in Communication Design (CD), Industrial Design (ID), and Textile & Apparel Design (TAD).

This course has a total of 75 seats. NID Andhra Pradesh is an Institute of National Importance (INI).

== Infrastructure ==
The transit campus for the institute was set up at the EEE & ECE Block, Acharya Nagarjuna University. The campus included Studios, Knowledge Management Centre (Library) and IT Labs. Also, the institute provides students with full-time internet access. In early 2024, the institute shifted to its permanent 50-acre (20 ha) campus in Amaravati, Andhra Pradesh, India.
