= National Institute of Design, Haryana =

Design school in Kurukshetra, India

Coordinates: 29.9657°N 76.8370°E

- Type: Autonomous national institution
- Established: 15 November 2016; 9 years ago
- Chairperson: Joint Secretary, DPIIT, Ministry of Commerce & Industry
- Director: Ramneek Kaur Majithia
- Undergraduates: 200+
- Location: Umri, Kurukshetra, Haryana, India
- Campus: Urban, 20 acres (8.1 ha)
- Website: www.nidh.ac.in

National Institute of Design, Haryana is an Institute of National Importance, as per the National Institute of Design Act, 2014 and the NID (Amendment) Act 2019, established on 15 November 2016 as an autonomous institute under the Department for Promotion of Industry and Internal Trade (DPIIT), Ministry of Commerce and Industry, Government of India, to emerge as a global leader in Design Education and Research. The institute aims at becoming the torchbearer for innovative design directions in the industry, commerce and development sectors.

== History ==
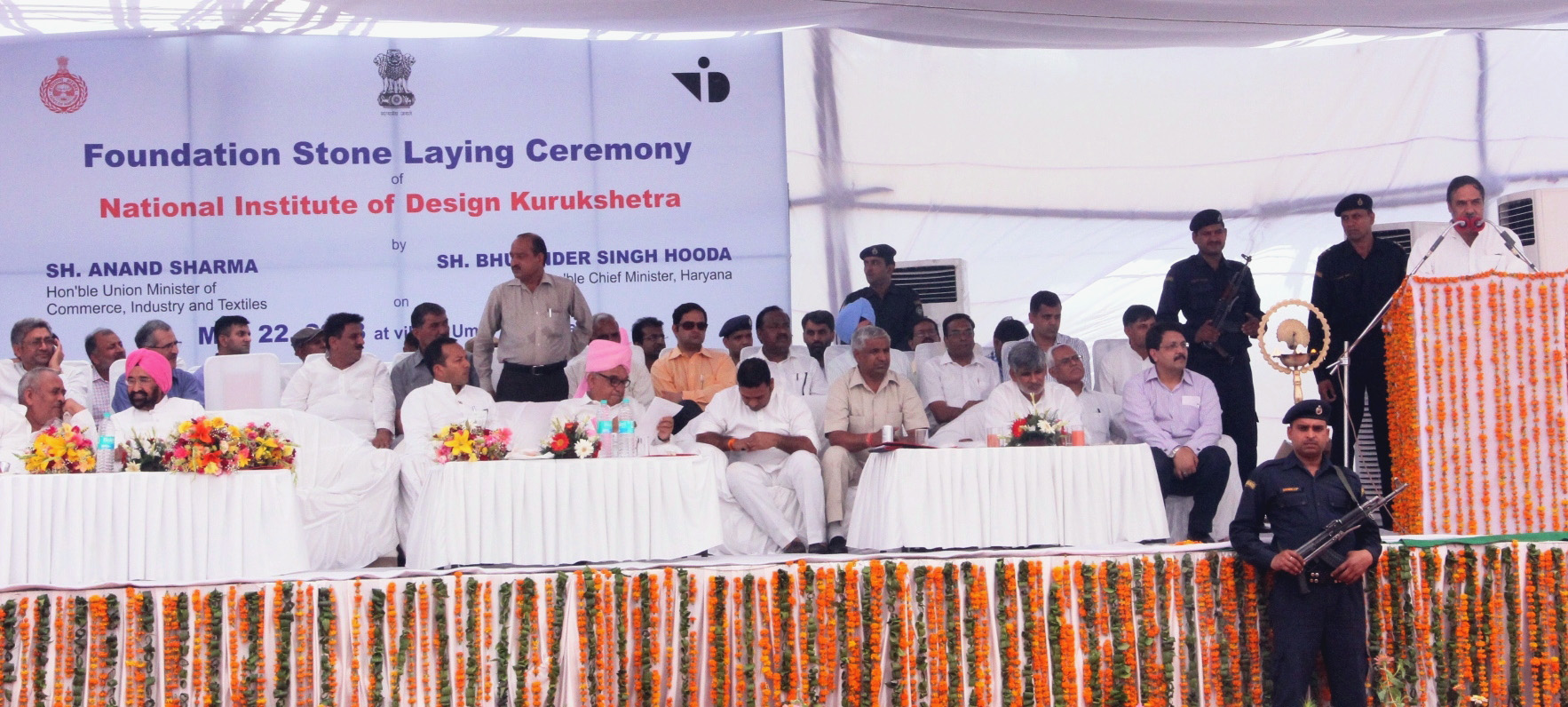
Foundation stone laying ceremony of the National Institute of Design (NID), at Umri, Kurukshetra, Haryana

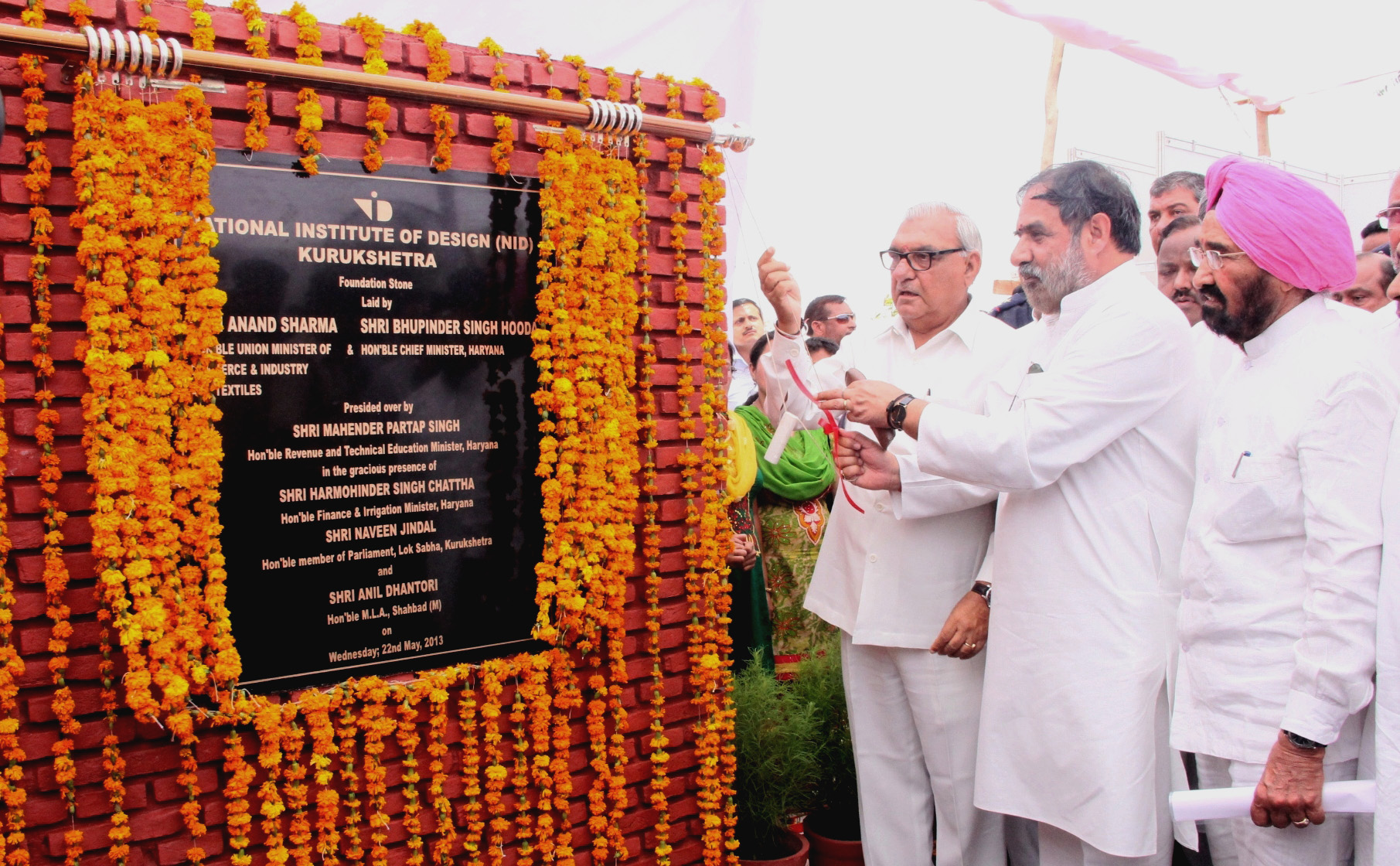

The creation of four additional NIDs was suggested as part of the central government's 2007 National Design Policy. The Institute was the third one to get established by the Government of India in 2016. First Full time Director Dr. Vanita Ahuja was appointed in January 2019. The classes were initially started from the transit campus at Government Polytechnic, Umri, Kurukshetra. Later in January 2022, entire operations shifted to its newly built campus sprawling over 20 acres of land built in the form of an endless knot at Kurukshetra along Grand Trunk Road.

== Courses offered ==
NID Haryana currently offers full-time four year Bachelor of Design (B.Des.) programme with specialisation streams of :

INDUSTRIAL DESIGN

COMMUNICATION DESIGN

TEXTILE & APPAREL DESIGN

The Bachelor of Design (B.Des.) programme commences with a two semester rigorous Foundation Program followed by six semesters of specialized courses. Based on the choice & merit, students are allotted discipline from 2nd year. Teaching methodology incorporates Industry and Field exposure. Module based learning process is adopted for course conduction and evaluation of students is done on Credit based system.

== Admission ==
Annual intake is of 75 seats (Indian students) + 11 seats (Overseas Students). Admission to all the NIDs including NID Haryana is through a common entrance test called NID-DAT (Design Aptitude Test). The NID Design Aptitude Test (NID-DAT) is a two-stage national-level entrance examination for the NIDs, organised every year by the NID Admissions Cell for admissions to undergraduate courses. The first stage of the examination is NID-DAT Prelims, which is a pen-and-paper design and general aptitude test, and the second stage is NID-DAT Mains, which is usually an in-studio design test and may also include a personal interview and portfolio review. The tests aim to evaluate the candidate's visualisation skills, creative & observation skills, knowledge, comprehension, analytical ability, etc. All students with Plus Two or equivalent qualification can appear for the test. The applications are normally open in November every year. The students appearing for the plus two exam also can apply.

== See also ==
- List of institutions of higher education in Haryana
- Other National Institutes of Design
- The India Report
