= National Institute of Design, Assam =

Design school in Jorhat, India

Coordinates: 26.7415°N 94.2279°E

- Type: Autonomous National Institution
- Established: 22 February 2019; 7 years ago
- Chairperson: Joint Secretary, DPIIT, Ministry of Commerce & Industry, Government of India
- Director: J. P. Sampath Kumar
- Undergraduates: 75
- Location: Tocklai, Jorhat, Assam, India
- Campus: Rural
- Website: nidj.ac.in

National Institute of Design, Assam or NID Jorhat is a design institute located in Jorhat, Assam. The foundation stone of the Jorhat NID was laid on 19 February 2011, by then Prime Minister Manmohan Singh. The fund for the institute was allocated in February 2014. The Union Minister of Commerce and Industry Suresh Prabhu inaugurated the institute at Rajabari on 22 February 2019 via video telecast. The institute offers four year courses in Textile & Apparel Design, Communication Design and Industrial Design.

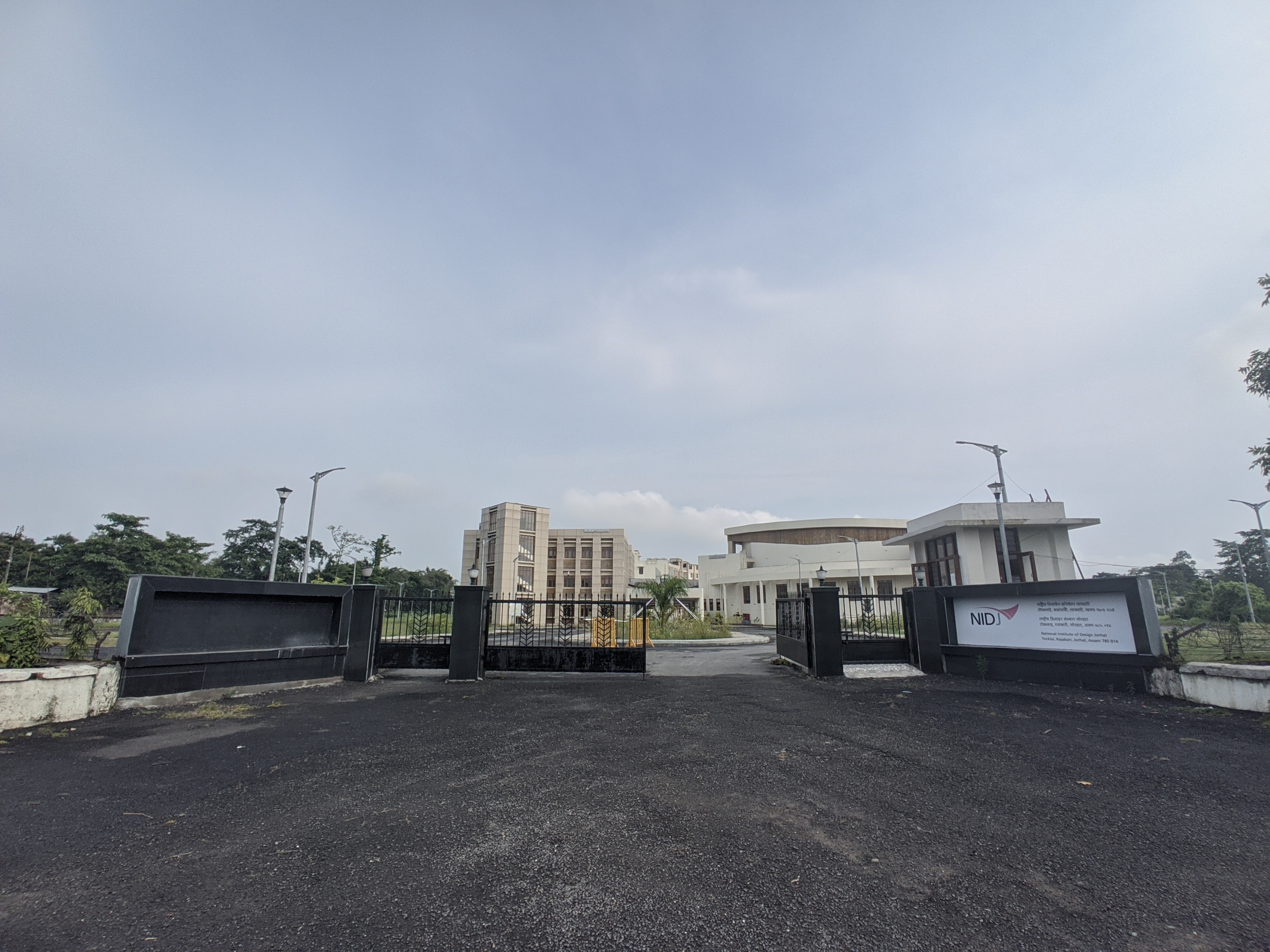
NID, Assam

== History ==
In early 2007, Department for Promotion of Industry and Internal Trade (erstwhile Department of Industrial Policy and Promotion), Ministry of Commerce and Industry, Govt. of India had envisioned the National Design Policy aimed at creating a design-enabled innovation economy and strengthening design education in the country. The National Design Policy had recommended setting up design institutes on the lines of NID, Ahmedabad in various parts of India to promote design programmes. Under this Action Plan, 4 new NIDs have been set up in Andhra Pradesh (Amaravati), Assam (Jorhat), Madhya Pradesh (Bhopal), and Haryana (Kurukshetra).

== Campus ==
The campus is located at Tocklai village. It is on the bank of local river namely Tocklai river. It is ~8 km (5.0 mi) away from Jorhat Airport and 2.5 km (1.6 mi) from Jorhat Town railway station.

== Courses offered ==
The institute offers three main courses, Textile and Apparel design, Communication Design and Industrial Design all of which follow the two semester per year pattern.

=== Bachelor of Design (B. Des) ===
This 4-year course is offered in three specializations after passing of the NID (Amendment Act) 2019 and INI status of NID Assam. This course has a total of 75 seats. Previously, a Graduate Diploma Programme (GDP) was offered.
