= National Institutes of Design =

Group of public design schools in India

- Type: Public
- Established: 1961
- Academic affiliations: WDO
- Language: English

Location of the 6 functioning NIDs

The National Institutes of Design (NID) is a group of autonomous public design institutes in India, with the first institute established in 1961 in Ahmedabad. The other NIDs are located in the cities of Kurukshetra, Amaravati, Jorhat and Bhopal. The NIDs function autonomously under the Department for Promotion of Industry and Internal Trade (DPIIT), Ministry of Commerce and Industry, Government of India. The NIDs are recognised by the Department of Scientific and Industrial Research of the government's Ministry of Science and Technology as a scientific and industrial research organisation. The institutes are accorded the status of Institutes of National Importance under the National Institute of Design Act, 2014.

== Institutes ==
The primary institute is located in Ahmedabad with extension campuses in Gandhinagar and Bengaluru. The creation of four additional NIDs was suggested as part of the central government's 2007 National Design Policy.

The Union Budget 2026-27 prioritizes the burgeoning design sector, addressing the critical talent shortage through strategic expansion. Finance Minister Nirmala Sitharaman’s proposal for a new National Institute of Design in Eastern India marks a pivotal shift in regional development. This initiative reinforces the national design vision, integrating the East into a high-caliber institutional framework dedicated to professional excellence and innovation.

National Institutes of Design
#	Institute	City	State	Established	Website
1	National Institute of Design, Ahmedabad	Ahmedabad	Gujarat	1961	nid.edu
2	National Institute of Design, Andhra Pradesh	Amaravati	Andhra Pradesh	2015	nid.ac.in
3	National Institute of Design, Haryana	Kurukshetra	Haryana	2016	nidh.ac.in
4	National Institute of Design, Madhya Pradesh	Bhopal	Madhya Pradesh	2019	nidmp.ac.in
5	National Institute of Design, Assam	Jorhat	Assam	2019	nidj.ac.in
6	National Institute of Design, Bengaluru	Bengaluru	Karnataka	2006	nid.edu/
7	National Institute of Design, Gandhinagar	Gandhinagar	Gujarat	2004	nid.edu/

== Admissions ==
The NID Design Aptitude Test (NID-DAT) is a two-stage national-level entrance examination for the National Institutes of Design (NIDs), organized annually by the NID Admissions Cell for admissions to undergraduate and postgraduate courses at these institutes. The first stage of the examination is the NID-DAT Prelims, which consists of a pen-and-paper design and general aptitude test. The second stage is the NID-DAT Mains, which typically includes an in-studio design test and may also feature a personal interview. The tests aim to evaluate candidates' visualization skills, creativity, observational abilities, knowledge, comprehension, and analytical skills, among other competencies.

== Academics ==
The courses available at NID span a wide range of disciplines (like graphic design, product design, interior design, filmmaking, animation, etc.) and include Bachelor of Design (B.Des.), Graduate Diploma Program in Design (GDPD), Master of Design (M.Des.) and doctoral programs (PhD). Several international programs and foundation courses are also available.

== See also ==
- T-Works
- IIT Bombay IDC School of Design
