= Calico Museum of Textiles =

- Location in Ahmedabad
- Established: 1949; 77 years ago Shahibaug, Ahmedabad
- Coordinates: 23°03′12″N 72°35′32″E
- Type: History museum, Textile museum
- Owner: Sarabhai Foundation
- Website: calicomuseum.org

The Calico Museum of Textiles is located in the city of Ahmedabad in the state of Gujarat in western India. The museum is managed by the Sarabhai Foundation.

== History ==
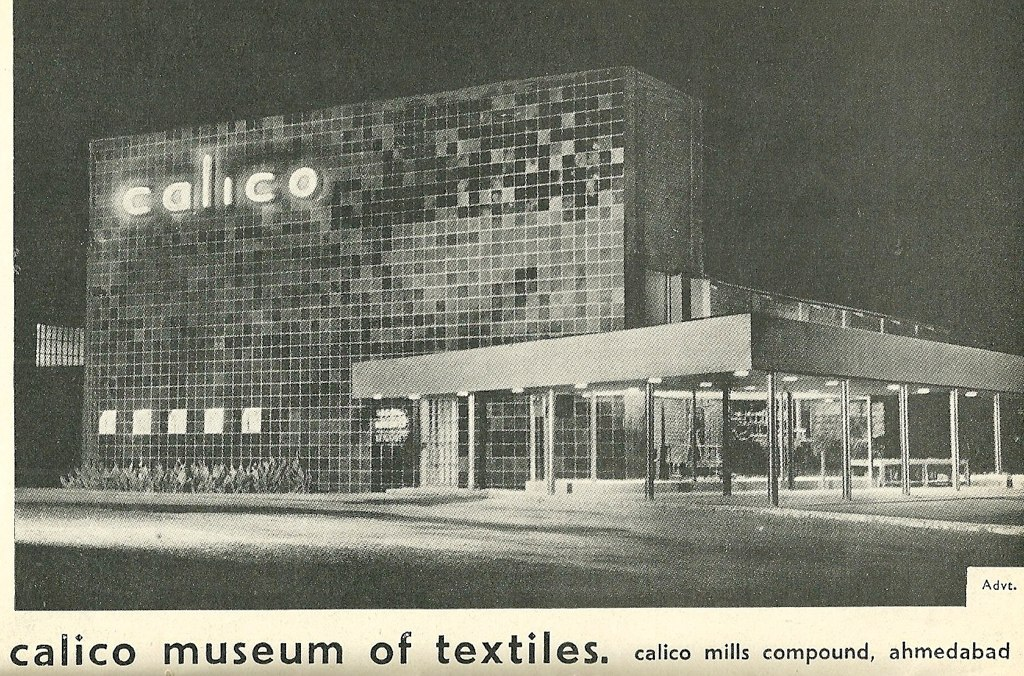
The Calico Museum of Textiles, as it appeared in its original location at the Calico Mills. (Annotated by Nathan Hughes Hamilton)

The museum was founded in 1949 by the enterprising siblings Gautam Sarabhai and Gira Sarabhai. Ahmedabad at that time had a flourishing textile industry. The museum was originally housed at the Calico Mills in the heart of the textile industry. But as the collection grew the museum was shifted to the Sarabhai House in Shahibaug in 1983.

== Story of the Calico Museum ==
The museum was inspired by Ananda Coomaraswamy, who, in conversations with Gautam Sarabhai during the 1940s, suggested the founding of a textile institute in the city of Ahmedabad, a major trading centre of the textile industry of the sub-continent since the fifteenth century. In 1949 Gautam and Gira Sarabhai and the great industrial house of Calico acted founded the Calico Museum of Textiles in Ahmedabad, as the specialist museum in India concerned with both the historical and technical study of Indian handicraft and industrial textiles. Gira established and curated the Calico Museum of Textiles which houses a historic collection of Indian Fabrics. It is also the centre for design knowledge, resources, research and publication. In addition to this, Gira also designed the building. It was built around a courtyard to facilitate contemporary gatherings and functions. It was populated with traditional facades and other carved wood elements dismantled from old residential Gujrati Houses.

By the early fifties the museum discovered its original intent, encompassed too large an area and concentrated its energies on the vast and vital field of handicraft textiles, devoting less and less time to industrial fabrics. By the second decade of its existence the museum launched an ambitious publications programme. The programme worked on two series, namely Historical Textiles Of India under the editorship of John Irwin (1917-1997), then keeper of the Indian Section of the Victoria and Albert Museum; and the second, under the editorial direction of Dr Alfred Bühler, fümer Director of the Museum Für Volkerkunde Und Schweizerisches Museum Für Volkskunde, Basel, who conducted a Contemporary Textile Craft Survey of India.

Inaugurating the museum in 1949, Jawaharlal Nehru stated, "The early beginnings of civilization are tied up with the manufacture of textiles, and history might well be written with this as the leading motif." And indeed, so well had the Calico Museum of Textiles fulfilled this brief that by 1971 the House of Calico decided that the excellence of the fabric collection and the invaluable research conducted by the publications department were such that the museum should be an independent society.

The museum's publications, which have now taken two distinct directions, give some indication of where the next surge of activity will take place. While the number of publications concerned with historical studies continues and increases, the second direction has resulted in research and publication of studies preoccupied with the technical and scientific examinations of textile processes such as looms, dyeing, printing techniques, etc.

== Textile collection ==
The textiles on display include court textiles used by the Mughal and provincial rulers of 15th to 19th centuries. Also on display are regional embroideries of the 19th century, tie-dyed textiles and religious textiles. The galleries also have exhibits on ritual art and sculpture, temple hangings, miniature paintings, South Indian bronzes, Jain art and sculpture, and furniture and crafts. There are also textile techniques galleries and a library. The museum has played an important role in determining the curriculum taught in the textile designing courses at the prestigious National Institute of Design also located in Ahmedabad.

The items on display are well protected by the museum authorities. The textile are protected from dust, air pollution and fluctuations in temperatures by the trees around the museum complex. The relative humidity inside the museum is also controlled and lights are dimmed between visiting hours to extend the life of the textiles.

== See also ==
- Calico Mills
- Calico Dome
- Sarabhai family
- Gautam Sarabhai
- Gira Sarabhai

== Bibliography ==
- John Irwin, P.R. Schwartz, Studies in Indo-European Textile History, Calico Museum of Textiles, Ahmedabad, 1966, 124 p.
