= List of presidents of Sarah Lawrence College =

These are the presidents of Sarah Lawrence College in Westchester, New York:

No.	Image	President	Term start	Term end	Ref.
1		Marion Coats	1924	July 16, 1929	
2		Constance Warren	November 1929	1945	
3		Harold Taylor	August 1, 1945	June 30, 1959	
4 acting		Harrison Tweed (Note: Board of Trustees member)	July 1, 1959	July 14, 1960	
5		Paul Ward	July 15, 1960	June 30, 1965	
6		Esther Raushenbush	July 1, 1965	June 30, 1969	
7		Charles DeCarlo	July 1, 1969	July 31, 1981	
8		Alice Stone Ilchman	August 1, 1981	July 31, 1998	
9		Michele Tolela Myers	August 1, 1998	July 31, 2007	
10		Karen R. Lawrence	August 1, 2007	July 31, 2017	
11		Cristle Collins Judd	August 1, 2017	present	

Table notes:
