= Gira Sarabhai =

Indian architect and designer (1923–2021)

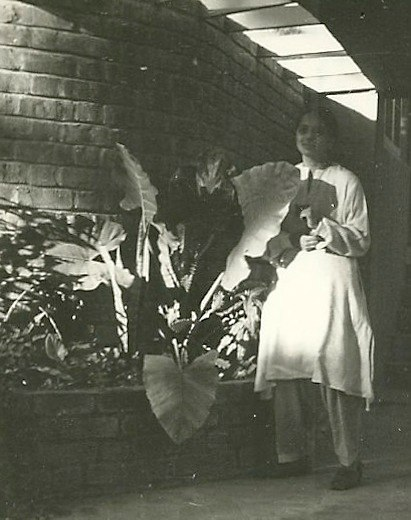
- Gira Sarabhai in 1951
- Born: 11 December 1923; Ahmedabad, British India
- Died: 15 July 2021 (aged 97); Ahmedabad, Gujarat, India
- Occupations: Designer, curator, entrepreneur
- Known for: National Institute of Design, Calico Museum of Textiles, Calico Dome, B. M. Institute of Mental Health
- Movement: Modernism
- Parents: Ambalal Sarabhai (father); Saraladevi Sarabhai (mother)
- Relatives: Gautam Sarabhai (brother); Vikram Sarabhai (brother); Gita Sarabhai Mayor (sister); Anasuya Sarabhai (aunt); Mrinalini Sarabhai (sister-in-law)

Gira Sarabhai (11 December 1923 – 15 July 2021) was an Indian architect, designer, and a design pedagogue. She was born into the Sarabhai family and was the youngest of eight siblings. She is known for contributing to several industrial and educational projects in Gujarat. She was the representative of the Sarabhai Foundation, a public charitable trust. Gira, along with her brother Gautam Sarabhai were crucial in establishing and designing the academic curricula of National Institute of Design, Ahmedabad.

== Early life ==
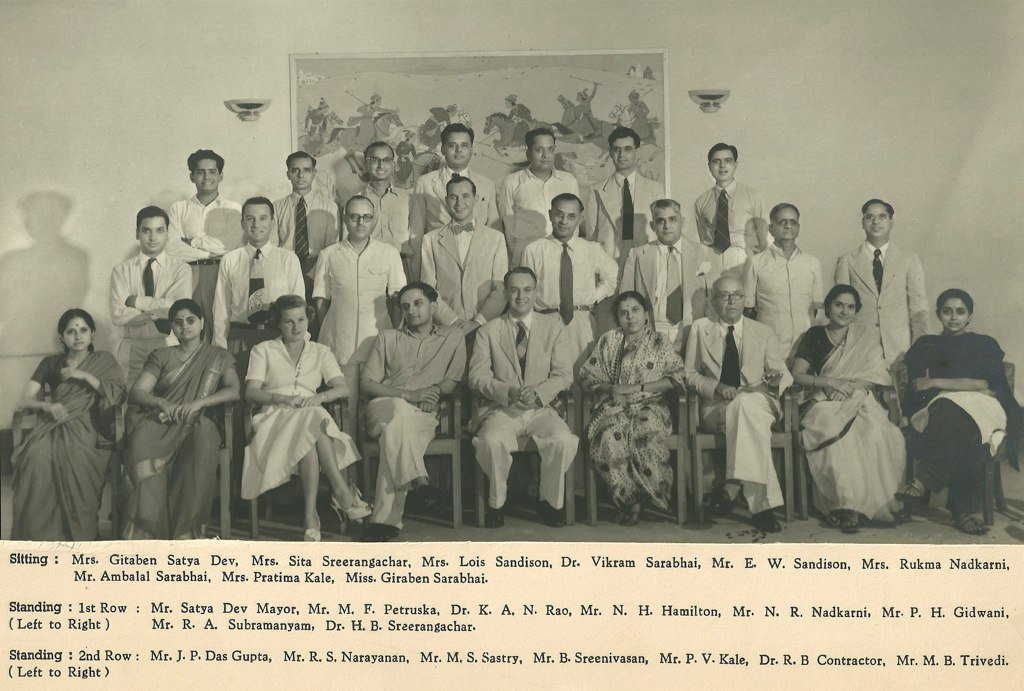
Gira Sarabhai, sitting, extreme right, along with her father Ambalal Sarabhai 3rd seat from the right, sister Gita Mayor sitting on the extreme left and their brother Vikram Sarabhai, seated, 4th from the left.

Gira Sarabhai was born on 11 December 1923 to industrialist Ambalal Sarabhai and Reva (later renamed as Saraladevi Sarabhai) in Ahmedabad and was the youngest of their eight children. She was home schooled along with her siblings, and never had a formal education. In her late teens, she moved to New York with her family. In the United States she went on to train with Frank Lloyd Wright at his Taliesin West Studio in Arizona from 1947 to 1951.

== Career ==
Gira and her brother, Gautam Sarabhai worked together in Calico Mills, and also in several other architecture and design projects. She also started Shilpi, a graphic design agency which was the first Indian based advertising agency.

Gira along with her brother Gautam made significant contributions to modern architecture in India, during 1950s and 1960s. Their work was highly influenced by Frank Lloyd Wright. They sought to create an architectural response to regional concerns by using local materials. They were instrumental in inviting Charles and Ray Eames, Buckminster Fuller, Louis Kahn, and Frei Otto to Ahmedabad in order for those architectural and design luminaries to develop architecture and design education in India. They contributed prominently to the setting up of several leading national institutes in Ahmedabad, such as the National Institute of Design, Indian Institute of Management Ahmedabad, and B. M. Institute of Mental Health.

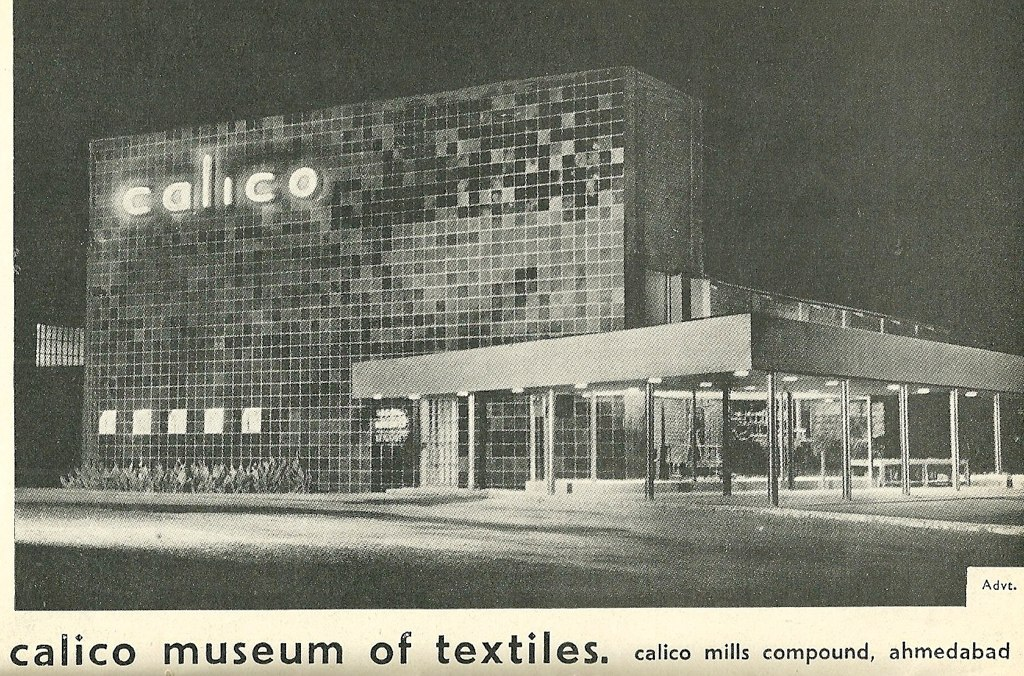
The Calico Museum of Textiles, as it appeared in its original location at the Calico Mills. (Annotated by Nathan Hughes Hamilton)

In 1949, Sarabhai established, designed the building, and curated the Calico Museum of Textiles which houses a historic collection of Indian fabrics. It is also a centre for design knowledge, resources, research, and publication. From 1951 to 1955, as Le Corbusier worked on the design of Villa Sarabhai, he consulted with Gira Sarabhai.

Gira and Gautam worked in collaboration with Fuller to develop the experimental Calico Dome. It was the first space frame structure in India, which lays collapsed. As of 2019, the dome is being reconstructed by the Ahmedabad Municipal Corporation as a heritage site.

Towards the later years of her career she started experimenting with traditional Indian forms, elements, and motifs for her contemporary work.

=== National Institute of Design ===
Gira, along with Gautam, had been crucial in establishing the National Institute of Design at Ahmedabad (NID) in the 1960s. They organized regular consultations at Sanskar Kendra Museum, with experts such as Dashrath Patel, James Prestini, and Vikram Sarabhai, to brainstorm on the academic model for the institute. Under the mentorship of Gira and Gautam, the first cohort of designers trained in India graduated.

Sarabhai was also instrumental in designing the main NID building. Kurma Rao, design consultant, educator, and alumni of NID Textile design department, gives Gira Sarabhai credit in shaping the Textile Design Program at NID. She would visit the institute, observe the students and give valuable feedback and make sure the students have full access to the Calico Museum, a privilege not extended to others.

Gira Sarabhai was also instrumental in selecting a wide selection of books, magazines, periodicals from audio-visual material for NID's library (now known as Knowledge Management Centre).

In 1964, Gira Sarabhai invited George Nakashima to the institute, where he designed various furniture articles. Until Sarabhai stepped down in 1975, production of the designs continued based on the drawings and instructions by Nakashima. Sarabhai invited several people from the Royal College of Art in London to serve as consultants for NID.

Students at NID recalled that she emphasised discipline and attention to detail in her work.

== Death ==
Sarabhai died on 15 July 2021 at her residence in Shahibaug, Ahmedabad.

== See also ==
- Sarabhai family
- Achyut Kanvinde
