= Ferry Hall School =

Girls' preparatory school in Lake Forest, Illinois, United States

Coordinates: 42°14′56″N 87°49′21″W

The Ferry Hall School was a girls' preparatory school founded in 1869 in Lake Forest, Illinois, United States. In 1974, Ferry Hall merged into Lake Forest Academy.

== History ==
The 1912-1913 Poetry Club.

Originally named The Young Ladies' Seminary at Ferry Hall, the school was founded in 1869. The capital for the project was made possible by a bequest from the will of Rev. William Montague Ferry, a Presbyterian minister and missionary. In its first year of existence, Ferry Hall enrolled 66 students, 37 of whom boarded at the school. It immediately became known as a school for daughters of the Midwestern social elite, and was supported by such figures as Speaker of the House James G. Blaine and Illinois Lieutenant Governor William Bross. The first principal was Edward Payson Weston, a Congregationalist minister from Maine. Ferry Hall was "no mere finishing school"; rather, it provided something of liberal arts education for women, including uncommonly-taught subjects such as science and mathematics. The Presbyterian influence on the school was very noticeable in the form of mandatory chapel, strict visitation rules (particularly for men), and rare opportunities to leave the campus.

The Commencement ceremony in 1905.

Over time, the Seminary became the "liberal alter-ego" of the town of Lake Forest, which "maintained staunchly conservative Republican Values." The Seminary was well known for the support of social justice and missionary work, and became notable for inviting such figures as Eugene V. Debs, photographer Jacob Riis, and a man from the National Peace Conference to speak at the school. From 1904-1914, the Seminary was headed by Socialist Frances L. Hughes.

In 1918, Eloise Ruthven Tremain took over as the head of the Seminary, beginning a 27-year-long period "noted mostly for the principal's control." Under Tremain's control, the Seminary entered a period of notable organization and financial success, continually running surpluses. Tremain "quickly raised the esteem of Ferry Hall in the local community" and brought Ferry Hall to the forefront of American schools for girls, garnering national attention. Tremain engineered the Seminary's legal and financial independence in 1925 from Lake Forest University, to which it had formerly been tied. Hollywood film studios were aware of Ferry Hall's stature and used it in promoting the career of Jean Harlow, a former Ferry Hall student. The film industry made much of Harlow's superior education: "To be admitted to Ferry Hall was a social achievement; to graduate from the school was a scholastic accomplishment". Ironically, Harlow never graduated.

Following Tremain's departure in 1947, the school slipped into financially hard times. Enrollment, which had been filled to capacity during the World War II, dropped off significantly; though some "suggested the school needed to reestablish its reputation through public relations and advertising," new headmistress Frances Wallace "stubbornly refused to try" these avenues. Ferry Hall's trustees stepped in and organized a major capital campaign that was intended to retire the mortgage still owed to Lake Forest College, eventually succeeding in the early 1950s.

The centennial celebration of Ferry Hall in 1969 included such figures as Maria Tallchief and Gwendolyn Brooks.

The Ferry Hall Chapel.

In the 1970s, headmaster John A. Bird began working with Lake Forest Academy to achieve coeducation: the schools had always been considered sister schools and, in recent years, had been offering opportunities to students of both schools. In the spring of 1974, the last class graduated from Ferry Hall. In the fall, Ferry Hall students joined Academy boys at their Mellody Farms campus and created the current coeducational institution Lake Forest Academy-Ferry Hall.

== Notable people ==
- Winifred Bonfils (1878–80), newspaper journalist
- Marion Coats (Ferry Hall principal, 1915–18; did not attend as a student), first president of Sarah Lawrence College
- Jean Harlow, model and actress
- Amy Hempel, author
- Doris Emrick Lee (1920–22), artist
- Charlotte Armstrong Lewi (1921–22), author/mystery writer
- Frances Perkins, (Ferry Hall chemistry teacher, 1904–06; did not attend as a student) first female U.S. Cabinet member (U.S. Secretary of Labor under U.S. President Franklin D. Roosevelt)
- Florence R. Sabin (Primary Department student, 1879–82), trailblazer for women in medical sciences
- Judy Baar Topinka, Illinois state treasurer
