= Karen Lawrence =

Karen Lawrence may refer to:

- Karen Lawrence (singer-songwriter), American singer and songwriter
- Karen Lawrence (writer) (born 1952), Canadian writer
- Karen R. Lawrence (born 1949), president of the Huntington Library, Art Museum, and Botanical Gardens
