= Kamalini Sarabhai =

Clinician

Kamalini Khatau Sarabhai
- Born: 1925
- Died: 1981 (aged 55–56)
- Education: Tavistock Clinic
- Organization: B.M. Institute of Mental Health
- Known for: Early Childhood psychological Development
- Spouse: Gautam Sarabhai
- Children: Mana Sarabhai Brearley, Shyama Sarabhai
- Parent(s): Mulraj Khatau (Father); Champubai Khatau (Mother)
- Relatives: Mike Brearley (son-in-law), Anand Zaveri (son-in-law)
- Family: Sarabhai family

Kamalini (née Khatau) Sarabhai (1925–1981) was a clinician who trained and worked at the Tavistock Clinic in the UK. She brought psychoanalytic practices to India when she and partner Gautam Sarabhai established the B.M. Institute of Mental Health in Ahmedabad in 1966.

== Life and work ==
Kamalini was the daughter of Dharamsey Mulraj Khatau and his wife Champubai Khatau, who owned the Khatau Group of Companies. She married industrialist Gautam Sarabhai, and the couple had two children, Mana and Shyama. The Sarabhai family was closely associated with prominent psychoanalysts including Erik Erikson. In the early 1940s Kamalini along with their two daughters traveled to London to pursue a six-year psychoanalytic training at the British Psychoanalytical Society (BPAS) and the Tavistock Clinic. There, she developed a connection with Anna Freud and also became a member of the British Psychoanalytical Society (BPAS) with a special interest in child development.

On returning to Ahmedabad, India, she started Balghar School in 1949, an experiment in nursery education, which has now evolved into a primary school.

=== BM Institute of Mental Health ===
In 1951, along with her partner Gautam Sarabhai, and American psychologists Lois Barclay Murphy and Gardner Murphy, she set up the Bakubhai Mansukhai Institute of Mental Health (BM Institute), which was in the lines of the Tavistock Clinic School of Family Psychiatry and Community Mental Health; with a basis on child‐focused research and practice aimed to supply a foundation for constructive programmes in mental hygiene, education, family and group living. The buildings of the institute were designed by Gautam Sarabhai, who was also an architect.

The Institute contributed to psychological research in India throughout the 1960s and 1970s and experimented with child psychology, behavioural therapy, and cures for mental illnesses and autism; and was frequented by various psychiatrists and psychologists including Erik H. Erikson. Kamalini Sarabhai remained the director of the BM Institute from its founding until her death in 1981.
