= Alexander Gunn =

Alexander Gunn may refer to:

- Alexander Gunn (politician) (1828–1907), Scottish grocery wholesaler and politician in Canada
- Alexander Gunn (doctor) (1845–1914), Scottish physician
