= Cristle Collins Judd =

President of Sarah Lawrence College

11th President of Sarah Lawrence College
- Incumbent
- Assumed office August 2017
- Preceded by: Karen R. Lawrence

Personal details
- Born: Texas, U.S.
- Education: Rice University (BA); King's College London (MA, PhD)

Academic background
- Thesis: Aspects of tonal coherence in the motets of Josquin. (1993)
- Doctoral advisor: Arnold Whittall

Academic work
- Discipline: Musicology
- Institutions: University of Melbourne; University of Exeter; University of Pennsylvania; Bowdoin College; Sarah Lawrence College

Cristle Collins Judd is an American academic administrator and musicologist serving as the 11th president of Sarah Lawrence College.

== Early life and education ==
Judd is originally from Texas, and earned her bachelor's degree in music performance from the Shepherd School of Music at Rice University. She earned her master's degree and PhD from King's College London, with a dissertation on the 16th-century Italian composer and theorist Gioseffo Zarlino.

== Career ==
Judd began her career as an academic at the University of Melbourne, and later held a role at the University of Exeter. In 1993, Judd became a faculty member at the University of Pennsylvania. She later served as dean for academic affairs and professor of music at Bowdoin College. Prior to taking office as president of Sarah Lawrence, Judd worked at the Andrew W. Mellon Foundation, where she was a senior program officer for Higher Education and Scholarship in the Humanities.

== Books ==
- Cristle Collins Judd, ed., Tonal Structures in Early Music (Garland Publishing, 1998)
- Cristle Collins Judd, Reading Renaissance Music Theory: Hearing with the Eyes (Cambridge University Press, 2000)
- Cristle Collins Judd, ed., Musical Theory in the Renaissance (Ashgate, 2013)

== See also ==
- List of presidents of Sarah Lawrence College
