= Donald Callander =

British Army officer (1918–1992)

Donald Fraser Callander
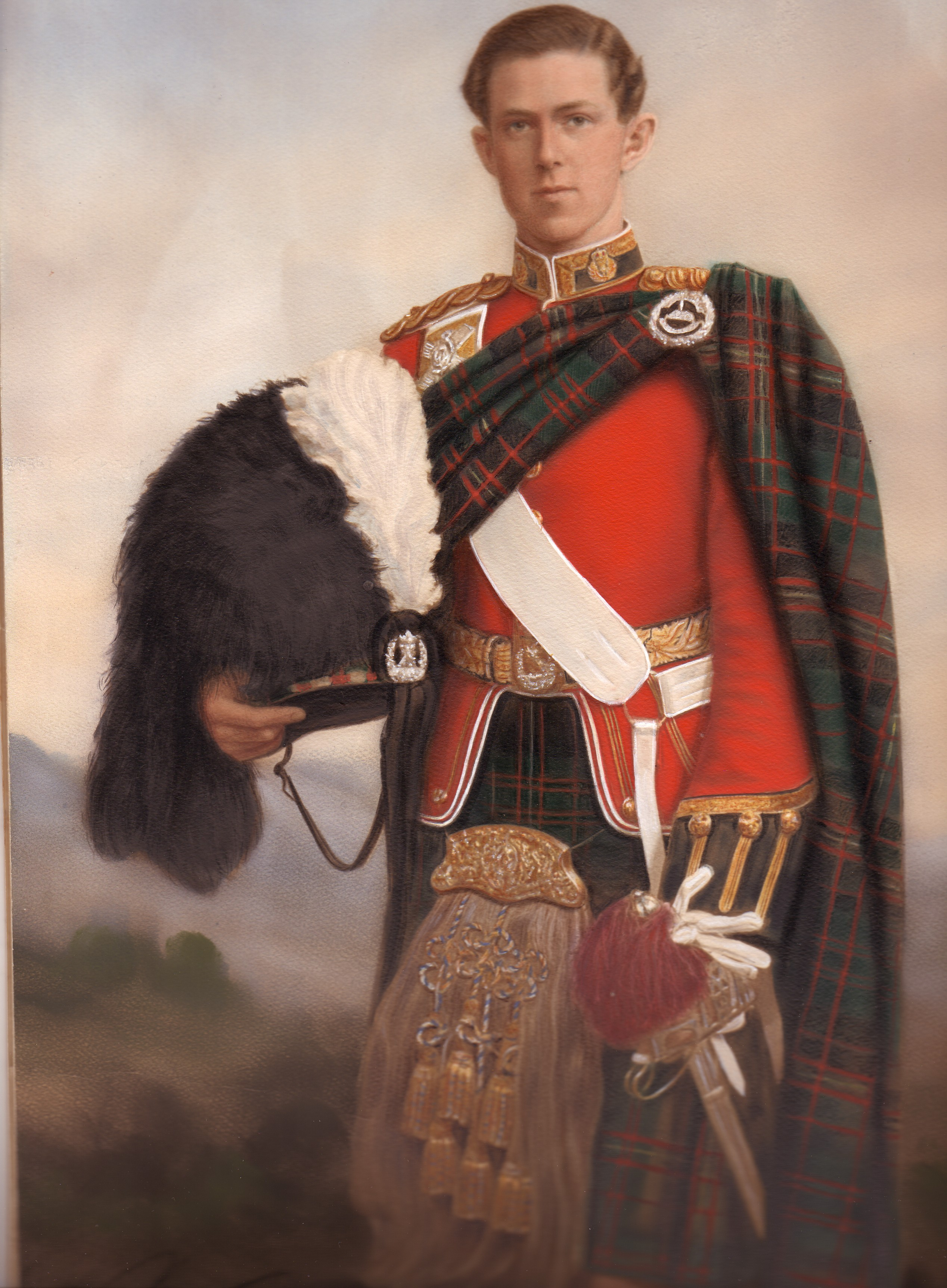
- Second Lieutenant Donald Callander on graduation from Sandhurst in 1938
- Born: 22 July 1918; Wallasey, Cheshire, England
- Died: 5 April 1992 (aged 73); Muirfield Scotland
- Military career
- Allegiance: United Kingdom
- Branch: British Army
- Service years: 1939–1963
- Rank: Major
- Service number: 85694
- Unit: Queen's Own Cameron Highlanders
- Conflicts: Second World War; Korean War; Malayan Emergency; Aden Emergency
- Awards: Officer of the Order of the British Empire; Military Cross & Bar
- Other work: Public Relations and Appeals Director, Scottish National Institute for War Blinded. (1963–1986) Member of the Queen's Bodyguard for Scotland (1967–1992)

Major Donald Fraser Callander OBE MC & Bar (22 July 1918 – 5 April 1992) was one of the last serving British Army officers to lead his men into battle wearing the kilt.

== Early life and career ==
He was born in Wallasey in Cheshire and educated at Clifton College in Bristol. This was followed by the Royal Military College at Sandhurst, and in January 1939 he was commissioned into the Queen's Own Cameron Highlanders, He was posted to his regiment's 1st Battalion, then commanded by Lieutenant Colonel Douglas Wimberley.

== Military career ==
He was sent to France on 23 September 1939 as part of the British Expeditionary Force (BEF). He received his first Military Cross as an "immediate award for courage and leadership" at La Bassée where, as commander of the battalion's anti-tank platoon, equipped only with three Hotchkiss guns Ordnance QF 2 pounders, they knocked out 21 German tanks from Rommel's 7th Panzer Division, while protecting the retreat of the allies to the beaches during the Battle of Dunkirk. He was evacuated with his platoon wearing their kilts on 1 June 1940. This battle was the last time a Highland Battalion fought in the kilt.

He was subsequently sent in 1942 to serve with No. 1 Commando on special duties with OC A Company in India. As well as training for jungle warfare against the Japanese he was in-charge of the Company guarding Nehru at Ahmednagar Fort. In August 1944, he joined the 5th battalion of the Cameron Highlanders, a part of the 51st Highland Division under C.O Lt.Col. Derek Lang in Possy area for the break-out from the Normandy bridgehead. In command of B Company he won his second Military Cross in the Battle of the Reichswald, Feb '45 as " the first to reach the enemy position with a handful of men". He also took part in the capture of Le Havre and the Rhine Crossing before leaving Germany in April 1945

In May 1945 he joined the army Staff College in Quetta India as GSO 2 at the Tactical School, where he served until 1947 when he became Deputy Assistant Quartermaster General (DAQMG) at the War Office in London. He returned to regimental duty in February 1950 as an instructor at the Highland Brigade Training Centre, becoming the Adjutant of HQ The Highland Brigade in 1951. He was Brigade Major of 152nd Highland Brigade in Inverness from 1952-55 serving at Fort George before he joined the Commonwealth Division on the 38th Parallel in Korea.

Serving in Korea with the Commonwealth Division.

This was followed by "jungle bashing" in Malaya during the Emergency until the Suez Crisis in 1956, when he was flown to Aden and saw action against dissident tribesmen in the Aden Protectorate and Yemen. In 1959 he became Deputy Assistant Adjutant General(DAAG) at HQ Scottish Command, and his final appointment was as GSO II (General Staff Officer) at the War Office. He resigned and took early retirement from the army in April 1963 following the earlier amalgamation of 1st Battalion, Queen's Own Cameron Highlanders and 1st Battalion, Seaforth Highlanders, which in turn followed on from the 1957 defence review.

== Subsequent career and family ==
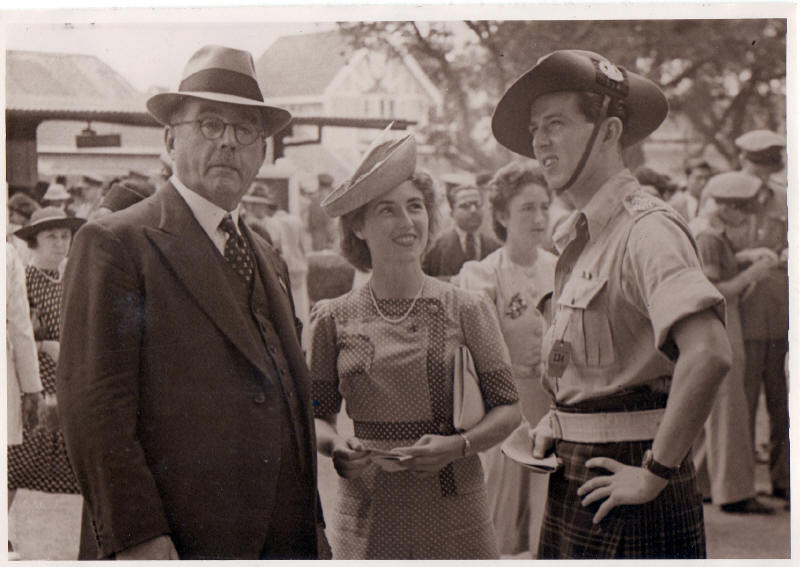
Donald Callander with future wife Margaret Geddis and her father Andrew Geddis at Poona Races Aug'43

During his first posting in India in 1942 he met Margaret, daughter of Andrew Geddis, who herself went on to serve in Burma and Japan with the Women's Auxiliary Service (Burma), known as the WASBs. They were ultimately married in London in 1948 and had two sons, Andrew in 1949 and Robin in 1952.

After retiring from the army he became Public Relations and Appeals Director of The Scottish Institution for War Blinded in Edinburgh and in the Queen's Birthday Honours List of 1985, he was awarded the Order of the British Empire for his long and successful work in this field. In 1967 he became a member of the Sovereign's Bodyguard for Scotland, the Royal Company of Archers. He was a keen shot and ran a shoot in the Scottish Borders with General Sir Philip Christison. He was also a member of the Honourable Company of Edinburgh Golfers. He played regularly at Muirfield where he died suddenly in the middle of a game aged 73 in 1992.

== Grave ==
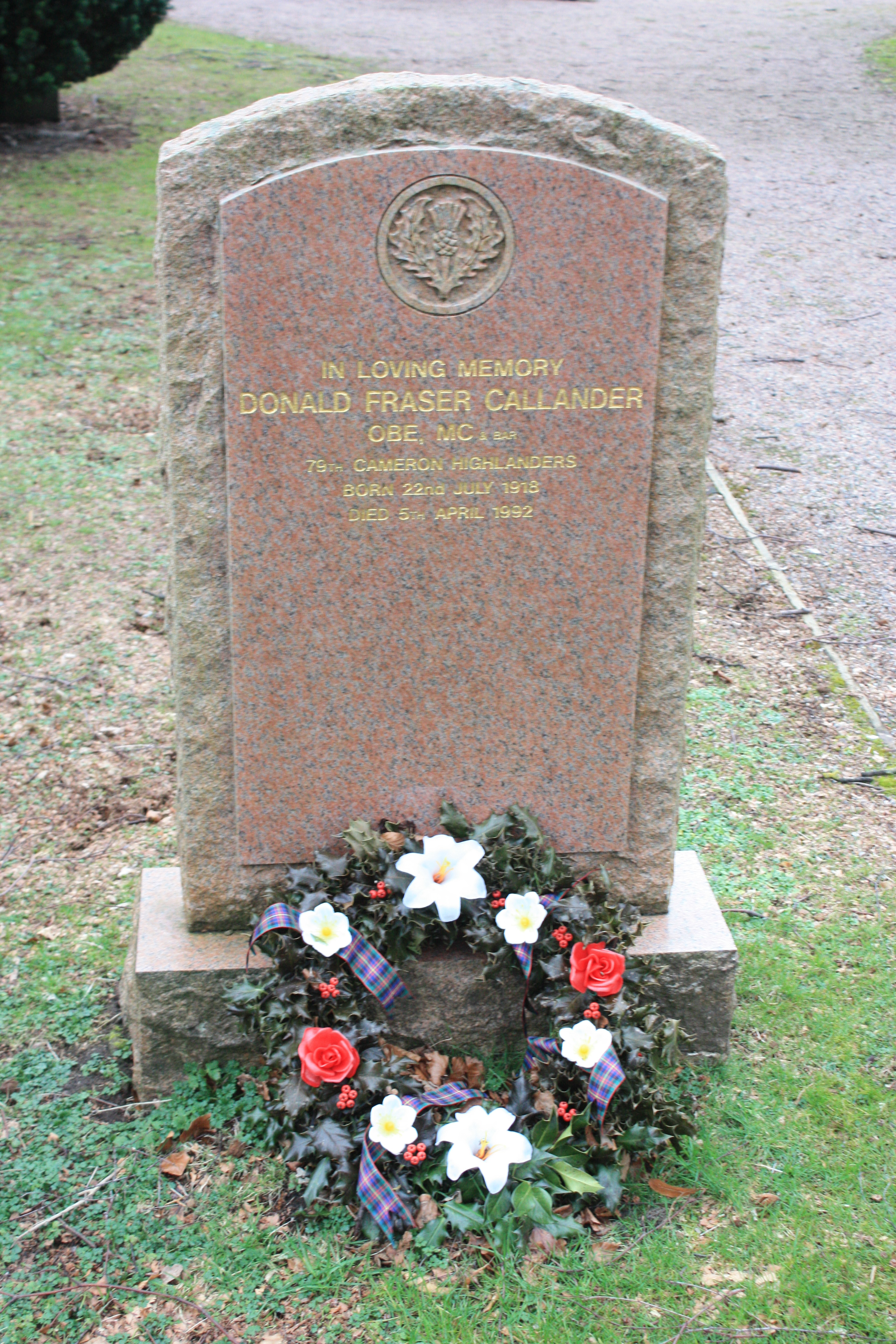
The grave of Donald Fraser Callander, Dean Cemetery

He is buried in Dean Cemetery in Edinburgh.The granite stone stands on the east–west path through the cemetery close to the war memorial for the Cameron Highlanders.

== See also ==
- History of the kilt
- 51st (Highland) Division

== Sources ==
- Regimental H.Q., Queen's Own Highlanders. Queen's Own Highlanders: A Short History. Inverness: Highland Printers, 1961
