= Andrew Geddis =

Mumbai businessman (1886–1976)

Andrew Geddis (July 1886 – 23 February 1976) was a leading businessman and sports enthusiast in Bombay in the decades leading up to independence.

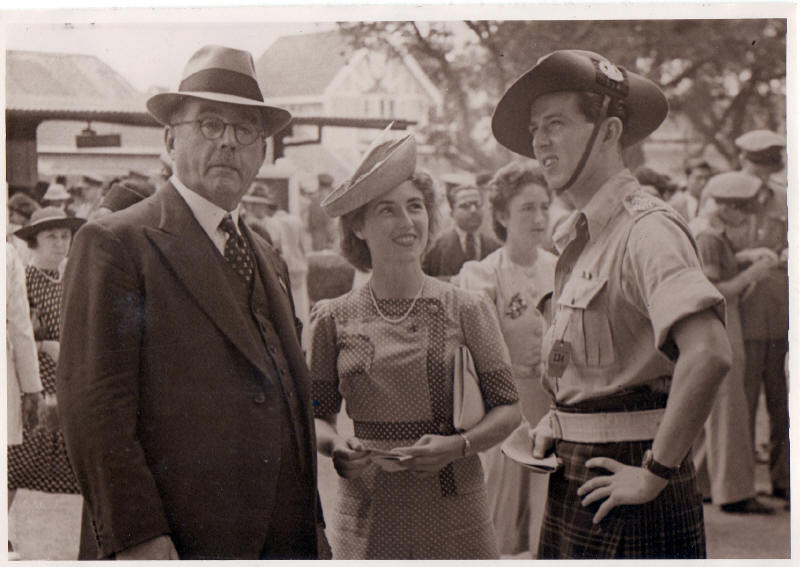
Andrew Geddis with his daughter, Margaret, and his future son in law Donald Callander at Poona races in 1943

== Biography ==
He was Chairman of the Royal Western India Turf Club (1931–1939) and instigated Mumbai Races's A.Geddis Plate. His extensive business interests included a directorship of the Bank of India Ltd and co-founding Geoffrey Manners & Co. Ltd., which became a leading distributor and manufacturer of Consumer Healthcare products and Pharmaceuticals across India until its amalgamation in April 2003 with the Wyeth Corporation, formerly known as American Home Products (AHP), one of the largest pharmaceutical companies in the world. He left Bruntsfield Place in Edinburgh for Bombay in 1907 to work for James Finlay & Co. Ltd. and went on to become extensively involved in the Ahmedabad textile industry becoming a Director of the Ahmedabad Jubilee Spinning & Manufacturing Co., Ltd. and the Ahmedabad Manufacturing & Calico Printing Co. Ltd., as well as Director of the India Cotton Association and the Chairman of Mill Owners' Mutual Insurance Association Ltd from its inception. His wider interests included, as well as co-founding Geoffrey Manners & Co. Ltd., directorships of the Tata Hydroelectric Power Supply Co., Ltd., the Indian Radio & Cable Communications Co.and the Bank of India Ltd. He was a member of the G. 1. P. Railway Advisory committee for 13 years and was appointed to the board of trustees for the Bombay Port Trust in 1920..

A keen horse racing enthusiast, as well as his chairmanship of the Western India Turf Club was also Chairman of the Turf Club House, Poona. Other interests included being Chairman of the Bombay Scottish Orphanage Society and Chairman of the Caledonia Society of Bombay.

Kamal Mahal atop Cumballa Hill in 1940

On his arrival in India he stayed in the Pali Hill Chummery. After his marriage to Jean Gunn, daughter of Dr Alexander Gunn of Edinburgh in 1915, he moved to Dharbanga Masions on Cumballa Hill before finally moving to the fourth floor apartment on the left below the penthouse in the iconic art deco Kamal Mahal building, originally called Sethna House, on Carmichael Road in South Mumbai, which together with the adjacent Altamont Road was rated the tenth dearest address in the world in a in 2009 survey. He also had a beach house at Juhu.
