= Karen R. Lawrence =

American college administrator and museum executive (born 1949)

9th President of Huntington Library
- Incumbent
- Assumed office September 1, 2018
- Preceded by: Laura Skandera Trombley

10th President of Sarah Lawrence College
- In office August 1, 2007 – July 31, 2017
- Preceded by: Michele Tolela Myers
- Succeeded by: Cristle Collins Judd

Personal details
- Born: 1949 (age 76–77)
- Spouse: Peter F. Lawrence
- Children: 2
- Education: Yale University (BA); Tufts University (MA); Columbia University (PhD)

Academic background
- Thesis: Style in Joyce's "Ulysses": A linear reading of the novel. (1978)

Academic work
- Discipline: English literature
- Sub-discipline: Irish literature
- Institutions: University of Utah; University of California, Irvine; Sarah Lawrence College

Karen R. Lawrence is an American academic administrator serving as the ninth president of The Huntington Library, Art Museum, and Botanical Gardens. She previously served as the 10th president of Sarah Lawrence College.

== Early life and education ==
Lawrence was born in 1949. She earned a Bachelor of Arts degree in English from Yale University and a master's degree in English literature from Tufts University. Lawrence earned a PhD degree in literature from Columbia University in 1978.

== Career ==
Lawrence is a scholar of English and Irish literatures. She is also a specialist on the work of James Joyce.

Lawrence began her career as an English professor at the University of Utah and University of California, Irvine.

In August 2007, Lawrence became the 10th President of Sarah Lawrence College, a liberal arts college in Yonkers, New York. At the college, Lawrence was a successful college fundraiser, increased financial aid, and grew the size of the student body at the college. In July 2017, after 10 years as president, Lawrence stepped down.

In September 2018, Lawrence became the 9th President of The Huntington Library, Art Museum, and Botanical Gardens in San Marino, California.

== Personal life ==
Lawrence's husband is Peter F. Lawrence, a physician. They have two sons.

== See also ==
- List of presidents of Sarah Lawrence College

Academic offices
Preceded by Michele Tolela Myers	10th President of Sarah Lawrence College; 2007 – 2017	Succeeded by Cristle Collins Judd
Preceded by Laura Skandera Trombley	9th President of Huntington Library; 2018 – present	Incumbent
