= Harold Taylor (educator) =

Canadian educator (1914-1993)

Harold A. Taylor (1914–1993) was the president of Sarah Lawrence College. He is remembered for his writing on education and philosophy, and his stand against McCarthyism's interference with American education.

== Biography ==
Born in Canada in 1914, he studied philosophy and literature at the University of Toronto and received his Bachelor of Arts in 1935. He received a Moss Scholarship for his "accomplishments as an athlete, musician, writer, and student," which funded his research for his Master of Arts in 1936, also at Toronto. After completing his Master's, Taylor received a fellowship to study philosophy at the University of Cambridge. However he transferred to the University of London and earned a Ph.D. in philosophy in 1938 with his dissertation "The Concept of Reason and Its Function in 17th and 18th Century Philosophy and Literature." Taylor was offered a teaching position with the University of Wisconsin's Department of Philosophy in 1939, where he taught "social philosophy, aesthetics and the philosophy of George Santayana" for six years. During World War II, Taylor left the university on temporary leave to conduct research for the National Defense Research Council.

== President of Sarah Lawrence College ==
In 1945, Taylor became the president of Sarah Lawrence College, replacing President Constance Warren. Taylor was the youngest president of an American college at the time. While president of the college, Taylor continued teaching courses in philosophy at Sarah Lawrence and also at the New School for Social Research. Taylor's own views influenced the college, pushing for racial integration and a more progressive environment. Taylor also worked with Eleanor Roosevelt, a supporter of Sarah Lawrence College, and Adlai Stevenson II as a special consultant on human rights issues. He led the integration of the first male students at the college under the G.I. Bill, the 1947 name change from 'Sarah Lawrence College for Women' to 'Sarah Lawrence College,' the college's Tennessee Valley Authority program (which brought interracial groups of students to the TVA for a firsthand account of the area's economics and race relations), and the approval of the college's first M.A. programs.

Taylor became a well-loved president and teacher at Sarah Lawrence and was "renowned for remembering the name of every student on campus." Taylor was also known for his "movie star looks," which may have contributed to rumors of his affairs with female students, faculty, and staff. He married Grace Muriel Thorne in 1941, but divorced later on. Harold Taylor was also known for walking around campus accompanied by his giant dog, a friendly and unofficial mascot at Sarah Lawrence College.

In 1950, Taylor edited and published a collection of essays, called Essays in Teaching (1950), collecting works by Esther Raushenbush, Horace Gregory, Helen Merrell Lynd, Rudolf Arnheim, Stephen Spender, and Norman Dello Joio.

In November 1951, Louis Budenz published the article "Do Colleges Have to Hire Red Professors?" in the magazine The American Legion, which was the first accusation of Sarah Lawrence hiring Communist professors. After the publication of the article, which accused Sarah Lawrence College and other colleges of hiring Communist professors, the Americanism Committee of the Westchester County American Legion began accusing and investigating professors at the college. As the fear of Communism spread and McCarthyism continued, more professors from Sarah Lawrence College, University of Chicago, Harvard, Amherst, and Wellesley were brought to the Senate Internal Security Subcommittee (also known as the Jenner Committee), leading to Sarah Lawrence and a handful of other educational institutions gaining the nickname "red school houses."

In 1952, Taylor and the board of trustees at Sarah Lawrence College presented the revised Sarah Lawrence College Statement on Academic Freedom, supporting the rights to freedom of speech and the rights of Sarah Lawrence professors, “teachers who meet the test of candor, honesty, and scholarly integrity may not be deprived of any rights they hold as citizens of this country, including the right to belong to any legal political organization of their own choosing." In 1953, eleven faculty members of Sarah Lawrence College were issued subpoenas to attend a hearing by the Senate Internal Security Subcommittee: Paul Harvey Aron (professor of history), Adele Brebner (professor of literature), Irving Goldman (professor of anthropology), Horace Gregory (professor of Poetry), Bert James Loewenberg (professor of history), Helen Merrell Lynd (professor of sociology), Lois Barclay Murphy (professor of psychology), Muriel Rukeyser (professor of literature), Mark Slonim (professor of literature, Director of Foreign Studies, and European Consultant for Foreign Studies), and Charles Trinkaus (professor of history).

Taylor hired a lawyer to defend and advise accused Sarah Lawrence faculty members, and organized the conference "Democracy and Communism in the Modern World," which brought together over 300 professionals and students from 40 educational institutions to discuss McCarthyism's attack on academic freedoms. Taylor urged students to advocate for their own academic rights and the rights of their professors, stating in his speech to students in 1951, "I have one last thing to say. I believe that the most important possession we have at Sarah Lawrence College is our political and intellectual independence and our freedom to carry out a democratic educational program. We can only preserve this independence and this freedom if we all stand together as students and faculty against the attacks on this freedom from whatever quarter they may come." Sarah Lawrence students wrote letters and articles, including a few published by The New York Times. The Sarah Lawrence student publication, The Campus, informed the college community on the accusations and other useful information. Taylor kept alumni of Sarah Lawrence College and parents of students informed on the state of the college and advised them on opposing the claims which were being made. The Citizens' Committee of Bronxville and Yonkers signed a petition in 1952 that called for an end to the investigation and interruptions in education. The efforts of Taylor, Sarah Lawrence community members, and others led Sarah Lawrence College to be awarded a special citation by the American Civil Liberties Union for a "powerful effort in behalf of academic freedom."

A patron of the arts and a supporter of arts in education, Taylor wrote on these themes, including his work titled Moral Values and the Experience of Art (1952), which began as a lecture Taylor gave at the New York Museum of Modern Art to the National Committee on Art Education and in 1960 Taylor published Art and the Intellect (1960).

In 1954, Taylor, faculty, staff, and students at Sarah Lawrence College petitioned to expel or censure Senator Joseph McCarthy. On February 27, 1954, Sarah Lawrence College held a conference to follow "Democracy and Communism in the Modern World." This conference, titled "The Nature of American Freedom," brought together representatives from 45 different colleges to speak on the nature of freedom, with specific discussions on freedom of the arts, education, politics, and religion. Taylor's book On Education and Freedom (1954) discussed the nature of freedom in education, but also the challenges McCarthyism had brought, and the politics of creating an educational space that allows students to think for themselves. Finally, McCarthyism began its decline, with the Senate's decision to censure Senator McCarthy.

== Subsequent career ==
Taylor resigned his presidency at Sarah Lawrence College in 1959. He traveled internationally to meet with political and intellectual leaders and to speak on education and the problems the world faced. Taylor traveled to the Soviet Union, the Middle East, Europe, Asia, and Australia. He became a visiting professor at overseas universities and lectured in social philosophy and education. From 1962 to 1963, Taylor hosted the ABC television series Meet the Professor. He published The World and the American Teacher: The Preparation of Teachers in the Field of World Affairs (1968), a declaration urging for an education on world affairs and Students without Teachers: A Crisis in the University (1969) which emphasized the role of the university in the global context, and its potential for encouraging real change. Of his other works in this period, The World as Teacher (1969) proposed that answers to many of the world's problems can be found in the field of education and How to Change Colleges: Notes on Radical Reform (1971), declared the necessary changes that the American college system needed to undergo.

Taylor held many leadership positions in dance and theater in New York, including president of the American Ballet Theatre, president of the Agnes de Mille Dance Theater, a trustee of the New York Studio School, and Vice Chairman of the Martha Graham School of Contemporary Dance.

In the 1960s, Taylor founded and chaired the Committee of Peace Research, which was sponsored and funded by the Institute for World Order and the National Research Council on Peace Strategy, for which he also served as a chairman. Taylor also cofounded the Peace Research Institute, which combined with the Institute for Policy Studies He also served as an advisor on human rights for the Eleanor Roosevelt Memorial Foundation.

Taylor founded and served as director for the Center for International Service at Staten Island College and cofounded the National Committee for the Support of Public Schools. In the 1970s, he founded and chaired the United States Committee for the United Nations University, and continued to work on a pilot for a "World College in collaboration with twenty-three United Nations member countries." Taylor's vision of a "World College" is described in his book The World as Teacher (1969), and includes information on "a three-year study of teacher education, combined with Taylor's interests in the development in the early 1960s of the World College program and the International Baccalaureate," and his works The United Nations University (1973) and A University for the World: The United Nations Plan (1974). Taylor was a John Dewey scholar and supporter and was "instrumental in arranging for the preservation of the John Dewey professional papers."

Taylor died in 1993 at the age of 78 years in St. Vincent's Hospital and Medical Center in New York City.

== Works by Harold Taylor ==
- Essays in Teaching (1950) (Editor)
- Moral Values and the Experience of Art (1952)
- On Education and Freedom (1954)
- Art and the Intellect (1960)
- The Goals of Higher Education (1960) (Co-Author)
- The World and the American Teacher: The Preparation of Teachers in the Field of World Affairs (1968)
- The Humanities in the Schools: A Contemporary Symposium (1968)
- Students without Teachers: A Crisis in the University (1969)
- The World as Teacher (1969)
- Art & the Future (1969)
- How to Change Colleges: Notes on Radical Reform (1971)
- The United Nations University (1973)
- A University for the World: The United Nations Plan (1974)
