= Alice Stone Ilchman =

American academic administrator

8th President of Sarah Lawrence College
- In office 1981–1998
- Preceded by: Charles DeCarlo
- Succeeded by: Michele Tolela Myers

8th Assistant Secretary of State for Educational and Cultural Affairs
- In office March 22, 1978 – March 31, 1978
- President: Jimmy Carter
- Preceded by: Joseph Duffey
- Succeeded by: William B. Bader

Personal details
- Born: Alice Stone; April 18, 1935; Cincinnati, Ohio, U.S.
- Died: August 11, 2006 (aged 71); Bronxville, New York, U.S.
- Spouse: Warren F. Ilchman
- Children: 2
- Education: Mount Holyoke College (BA); Syracuse University (MPA); London School of Economics (PhD)

Alice Stone Ilchman (April 18, 1935 – August 11, 2006) was an American academic administrator who worked as the eighth president of Sarah Lawrence College from 1981 to 1998.

== Early life and education ==
Ilchman was born in Cincinnati to Donald Crawford Stone, was an educator and federal planner in the Roosevelt and Truman administrations. She earned a Bachelor of Arts degree in religion from Mount Holyoke College in 1957, a Master of Public Administration from Syracuse University's Maxwell School of Citizenship and Public Affairs in 1958, and a Ph.D. from the London School of Economics in 1965.

== Career ==
Ilchman directed Peace Corps training projects at the University of California, Berkeley and taught South Asian studies there. She later taught and was a dean at Wellesley College. She later served as Assistant Secretary of State for Educational and Cultural Affairs under former President Jimmy Carter in 1978. Ilchman was the director of the Jeannette K. Watson Fellowship until her death.

== Personal life ==
Ilchman was married to Warren F. Ilchman, a political economist and former president of Pratt Institute. They had two children, Frederick and Sarah.

On August 11, 2006, Ilchman died at her home in Bronxville, New York due to complications from pancreatic cancer. She was 71 years old.

== See also ==
- List of presidents of Sarah Lawrence College

Government offices
Preceded by Joseph D. Duffy	Assistant Secretary of State for Educational and Cultural Affairs; March 22, 1978 – March 31, 1978	Succeeded by Bureau abolished and duties transferred to International Communications Agency; Reestablished 1999: William B. Bader
