= Ahmedabad textile industry =

The textile industry of the city of Ahmedabad in the state of Gujarat in India dates back to the 19th century, when the industry was established under the British raj. Textile mills employed thousands of people from across the state, and the cotton garments manufactured were exported around the world. The prosperity of the industry was the mainstay of the city's economy. It is called the "Manchester of India". Thus, Ahmedabad is officially famous for its cotton textile works.

Arvind Mills is a company that processes denim for jeans worldwide; it is located near the Sabarmati River, and the water required for the textile industry is easily available. The abundant black soil in Gujarat is best suited for the cultivation of cotton which is mostly required by the industry. Black soil is also found in Maharashtra.

Another major company in Ahmedabad is Ashima Group. Electricity and cheap labour are available in abundance. Ahmedabad stands very near to the sea, and as such, export and import are easy. Ahmedabad outsources maximum of its cotton fabric from Ichalkaranji, Maharashtra. It is finished here and sold all over the country.

Andrew Geddis was a director of the Ahmedabad Jubilee Spinning of cotton & Manufacturing Co., Ltd. and the Ahmedabad Manufacturing & Calico Printing Co. Ltd., as well as director of the India Cotton Association and the Chairman of Mill Owners' Mutual Insurance Association Ltd from its inception.
