= Marion Coats Graves =

American educator (1885–1962)

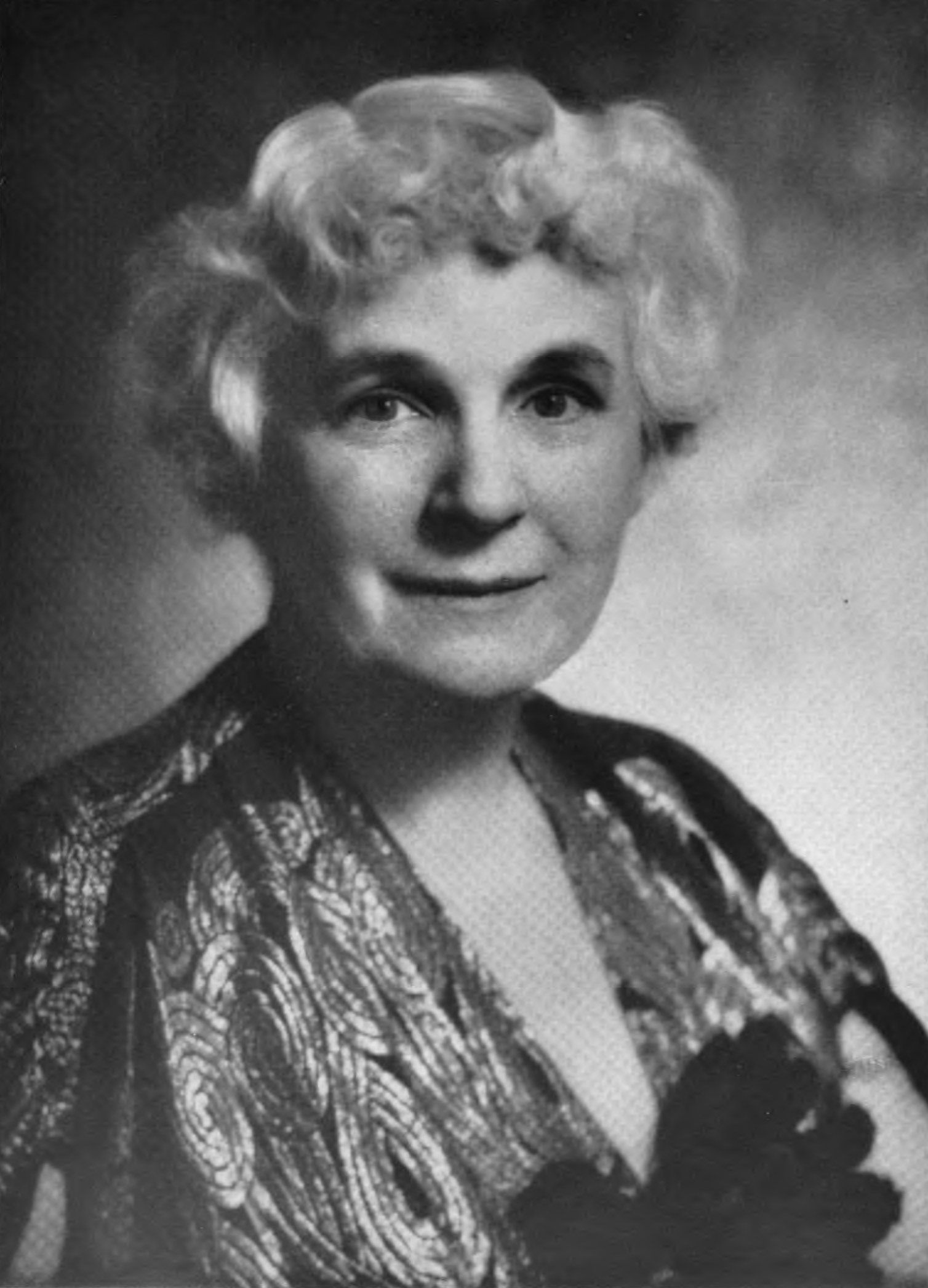
- Born: Marion Coats; August 2, 1885; Eaton, New York
- Died: November 19, 1962 (aged 77); Boston
- Occupation: Educator
- Years active: 1907-1951
- Known for: creating junior colleges for women
- Title: president of Sarah Lawrence College
- Spouse: Clifford L. Graves (m. 1929; died 1956)

Marion Coats Graves (August 2, 1885 - November 19, 1962) was an American educator known for her work in creating two-year junior colleges for women. She helped establish and was the first president of Sarah Lawrence College.

== Biography ==
Marion Coats was born in Eaton, New York on August 2, 1885. Her parents were Albert B. Coats and Dilla Marie Woodworth Coats. She graduated from Oak Place Private School in Akron, Ohio in 1903. She graduated from Vassar College with an A.B. in 1907. Her graduate work was done at Yale University (1910-1911) and then at Radcliffe College between then and 1915. She achieved an M.A. and Ph.D in philosophy. She also did additional post-graduate work at Teachers College, Columbia University between 1930 and 1932.

She began her teaching career immediately after graduating Vassar, teaching at various schools including Kimball's School in Worcester, Massachusetts, the Oxford School in Hartford, Connecticut and Miss McClintock's School in Boston. She taught subjects including math, Latin, English and athletics. In 1915 she became principal of Ferry Hall School in Lake Forest, Illinois. She was president of the National Association of Principals of Schools for Girls from 1920 to 1923.

She was the head of Bradford Academy in Bradford, Massachusetts from 1918 to 1927, which she helped transition into a junior college. It was her work at Bradford that brought her to the attention of Henry Noble MacCracken, who was assisting William Lawrence in his effort to endow a new college. She and MacCracken incorporated the ideas she developed at Bradford into the founding of Sarah Lawrence College. It became the first chartered junior college in New York state and she was its first president. It was one of the first two-year junior colleges in the country. She was president from 1926 to 1929, but ultimately resigned her position after she and MacCracken had disagreements over policy.

In 1932 she became acting president of Westbrook Seminary in Portland, Maine. She then served as dean of Ogontz Junior College in Rydal, Pennsylvania for nine years. She later returned to Bradford Junior College as its dean in 1950-1951 before retiring.

She married Clifford L. Graves of Hartford in July 1929. Her husband died before her, and she died in Boston on November 19, 1962.

== Selected publications ==
- Coats, Marion (April 1927). "The Junior College". Journal of the American Association of University Women. 20 (3). AAUW: 70–72 – via Google Books.
- Coats, Marion (May 1928). "A New Type of College". Bulletin of the American Association of University Professors. 14 (5). American Association of University Professors: 365–366. doi:10.2307/40217978. JSTOR 40217978.
- Coats, Marion (July 1928). "The Junior College". The Forum. pp. 82–90.
- Graves, Marion Coats (December 1933). "After Junior College -- What?". Junior College Journal. 4: 111–115.
