= Calico Dome =

Damaged geodesic dome in Gujarat, India

- Interactive map of the Calico Dome area
- Alternative names: Cali-shop

General information
- Status: Under restoration
- Type: Dome
- Architectural style: Modern architecture
- Location: Relief Road, Ahmedabad, India
- Coordinates: 23°1′42″N 72°35′30″E
- Inaugurated: 1962
- Renovated: 2013 (Phase I), 2025 (Phase II)
- Destroyed: 2001, 2003
- Client: Calico Mills
- Owner: Calico Mills (former); Ahmedabad Municipal Corporation (present)

Technical details
- Structural system: Geodesic dome
- Floor area: 12 square metres (130 sq ft)

Design and construction
- Architects: Gautam Sarabhai and Gira Sarabhai, inspired by Buckminster Fuller

The Calico Dome, also known as Calico-shop Dome, was a geodesic dome on Relief Road, Ahmedabad, Gujarat, India. Designed by Gira Sarabhai and Gautam Sarabhai, with an inspiration from Buckminster Fuller's works, it was a combined showroom and shop for Calico Mills. It was inaugurated in 1963 and fell into disrepair when mills was closed in 1990s. It later collapsed. As of 2025, it is being restored by the Ahmedabad Municipal Corporation as an industrial heritage site.

== History ==
American architect, Frank Lloyd Wright created a design for an administrative office for Calico Mills in 1950s, but it was not constructed as Ahmedabad Municipal Corporation (AMC) did not give permission due to prevailing building codes. Later on the same site, the Calico Dome was constructed.

By the time Wright's design was rejected in early 1950s, the basement for the building was already excavated. Siblings Gautam and Gira Sarabhai and their team designed the Calico Dome in 1963, inspired by Buckminster Fuller's geodesic domes. The dome housed the showroom and shop for Calico Mills. The first fashion show in Ahmedabad was organised in the Dome. Indian actress Parveen Babi took part in shows in the 1970s when she was a student.

The mills and shops closed in the 1990s and the dome went into disrepair. In the 2001 earthquake, the centre of the dome collapsed and heavy rains damaged the interior of the underground shop in 2003. Later the dome collapsed completely.

On liquidation of Calico Mills, the AMC bought it as the industrial heritage property in 2006.

== Architecture ==
The Calico Dome employed two simple structural systems: the geodesic dome and the space frame. The dome was lifted by eight curved iron struts. It was a five pointed dome instead of six or eight, as generally seen. The points were supported by steel pillars and tubes. The canopy of the dome was built by diamond-shaped bent plywood blanks joined by steel studs. The dome, spread over 12 square metres, covered an open air platform which can be used for displays and fashion shows. The platform was supported by steel frames which were left open at the margins of the platform for the natural light in the underground shop. The underground shop cum showroom was a single square room.

Gautam did the engineering whereas Gira did the detailing of the dome. It is known to be the first space frame structure in India.

A pair of embossed steel lotuses flank the steps leading to the platform. Similar lotuses are found in the spandrels of the 15th-century mosques and gates of the city as well as in the Sarabhai's house 'Retreat' which were added by Surendranath Kar in 1930s. These auspicious lotus symbols invoke welcome gesture.

On one side of the dome, a thin brick wall in Flemish bond was erected. A steel logo sign "Cali-Shop" in an abstracted font inspired by the Bauhaus style projected out from the wall from bottom to top.

== Restoration ==
In 2010, the High Court of Gujarat had asked the AMC to restore the dome in a year. The AMC planned to restore the structure in two phases, first the basement at a cost of ₹42 lakh (US$50,000) and then the dome at ₹60–70 lakh; cost of ₹120–150 lakh in total. The CEPT was roped in for suggestions. In January 2013, its restoration of base (Phase I) started, which was completed in fifteen months.

The consultant architect Hiren Gandhi, appointed by the Heritage Conservation Committee (HCC) of AMC, had proposed to replace the dome with new modern geodesic dome. The HCC rejected his plan and appointed Vadodara Design Academy (VDA) as a new consultant. VDA submitted a detailed report in November 2017. In August 2020, ₹2.26 crore (US$270,000) was approved for the restoration but the project was delayed. The restoration design proposed the use of 18mm plywood, computer numerical control-cut panels, epoxy and copper sheets to construct dome in its original form. The restoration began in March 2025.
