= Calico Mills =

Textile mill in India

Coordinates: 23.00575998°N 72.57518487°E

Ahmedabad Manufacturing and Calico Printing Mills Ltd
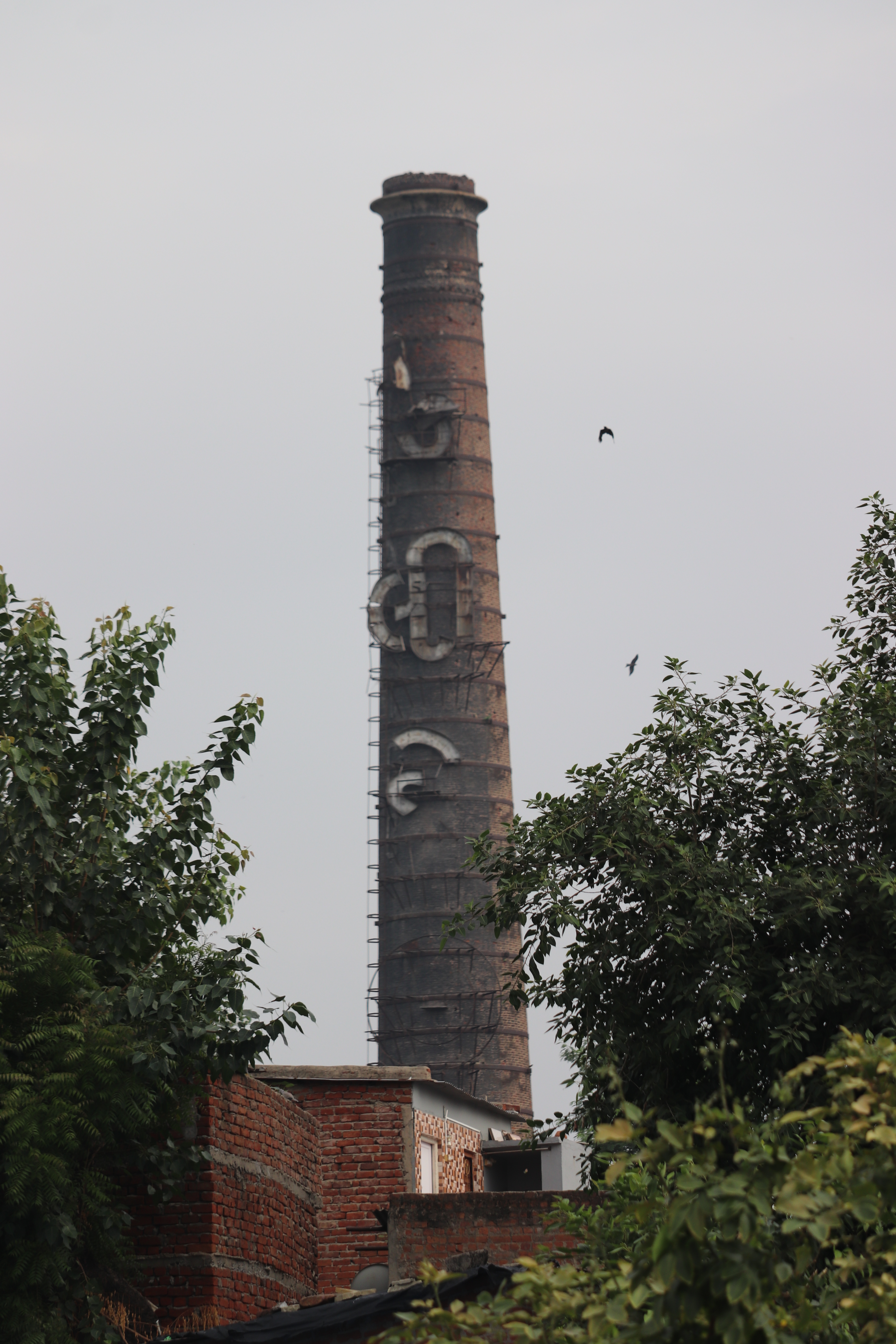
- Calico Mill chimney, the only surviving part of the former mill. The word "Calico" in Gujarati is inscribed on it.
- Trade name: Calico Mills
- Company type: Private
- Industry: Textile
- Founded: 1888 in Ahmedabad, British India
- Founder: Karamchand Premchand
- Defunct: 1998
- Fate: Dissolved
- Headquarters: Ahmedabad, India
- Key people: Sarabhai family

The Calico Mills, officially Ahmedabad Manufacturing and Calico Printing Mills Ltd and M/S ILAC Ltd, was one of the earliest textile mills established in Ahmedabad, India, by the Sarabhai family. Established in 1888, it closed in 1998. The land, plant and machinery were sold in a public auction in 2010s.

== History ==
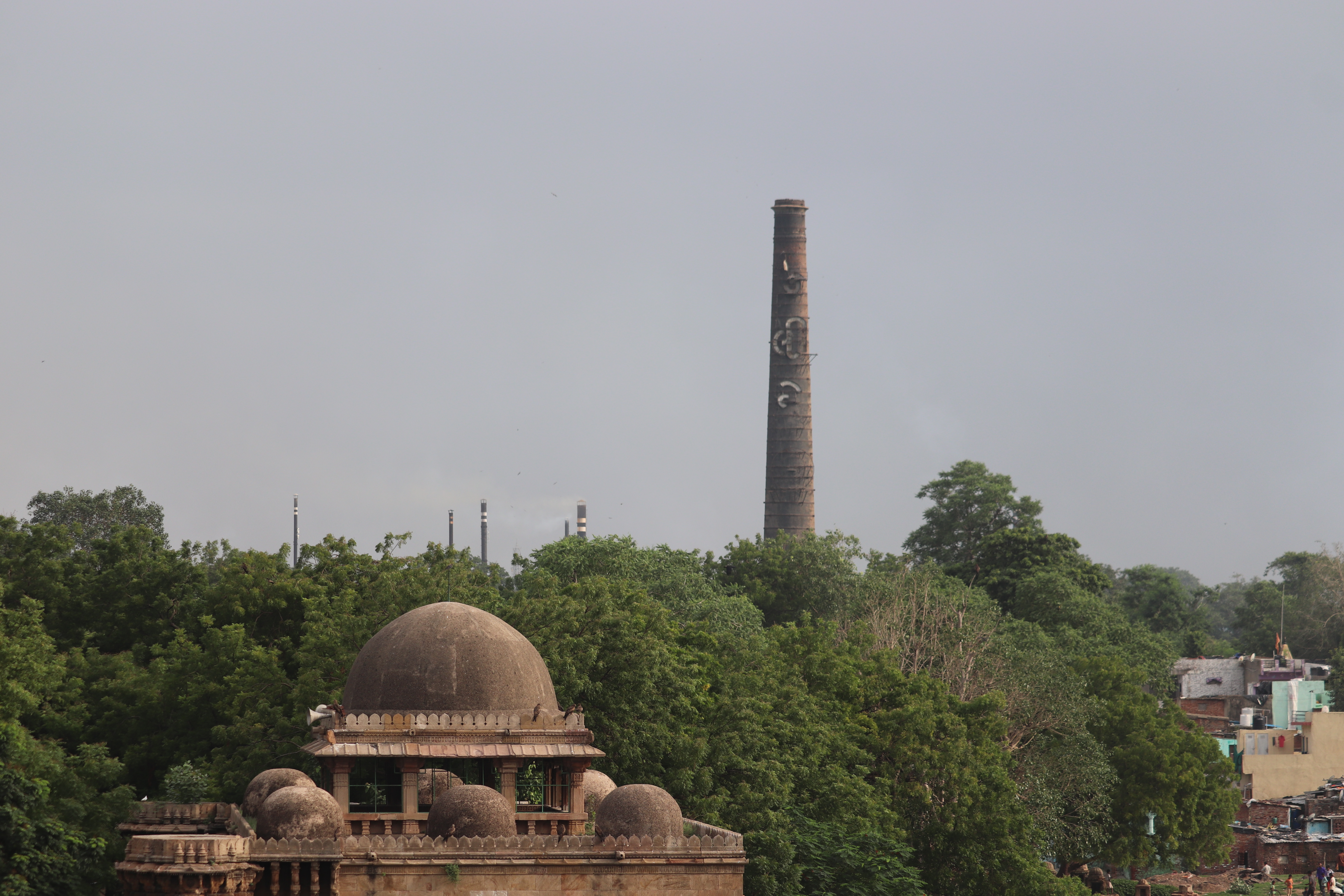
Calico Mills chimney from distance. Baba Lului's Mosque in foreground.

The Calico Mills was one of earliest textile mills in Ahmedabad, established in 1888 by Sheth Karamchand Premchand, the ancestor of Sarabhai family. The mills were spread over an area of 241,022 square metres (59.558 acres) on the bank of Sabarmati river. The mills flourished under Ambalal Sarabhai. It was later managed by Ambalal's son his nephew.

The mills were started showing downturn with time due to lack of upgrade, changing fashions, tax and debt collections and mismanagement. In 1982, 12,400 workers were laid off from the weaving department due to financial issues. Later 55 out of 64 mill units were in financial trouble. Eventually about 1,00,000 workers were laid off. After several attempts at revival, the Board for Industrial and Financial Restructuring (BIFR), a government body, recommended closure of the mills in 1995. The recommendation was opposed by the mills management but their appeal was rejected in 1997.

It was closed in 1998. The land, plant and machinery were sold in a public auction in 2010s. It was sold in seven lots of auction and fetched about ₹270.83 crore (US$28 million). The land parcel was unsold in 2010s.

== Products ==
For half a century, the Calico Mills became one of the most modern and extensively diversified pacesetters of the Indian cotton industry. Calico was the first Indian mill to give shareholders cloth at concessional rates. It was the first Indian textile mill to make cotton sewing thread, and later 100% synthetic sewing thread.

Calico main textile unit was the only textile plant in Ahmedabad to be fuelled by natural gas, with virtually no smoke and no air pollution. To minimize water pollution, Calico had its own primary effluent processing plant, which ensured that no waste was thrown directly into municipal sewers.

Calico erected India’s first Diamond Mesh Mosquito Netting plant in 1937, another first in India. In 1947, it diversified into chemicals, the manufacture of Caustic Soda, Chlorine and related products. Calico also erected India’s first PVC plant. In 1974, Calico commissioned its Polyester Fibre Plant in collaboration with ICI, (UK), producing four exclusive grades of Polyester Fibres, besides three superior conventional grades.

== See also ==
- Calico Dome
- Calico Museum of Textiles
