= Fred Otto =

German architect

- Born: 4 December 1883; Rabenau, Germany
- Died: 22 September 1944 (aged 60); Chemnitz, Germany
- Occupation: Architect

Fred Otto (4 December 1883 – 22 September 1944) was a German architect. His work was part of the architecture event in the art competition at the 1936 Summer Olympics.
