= Gautam Sarabhai =

- Education: Cambridge
- Occupations: Industrialist, Educator, Businessman
- Known for: National Institute of Design, Ahmedabad
- Notable work: Calico Dome
- Spouse: Kamalini Sarabhai
- Children: Mana Sarabhai, Shyama Sarabhai
- Family: Sarabhai family

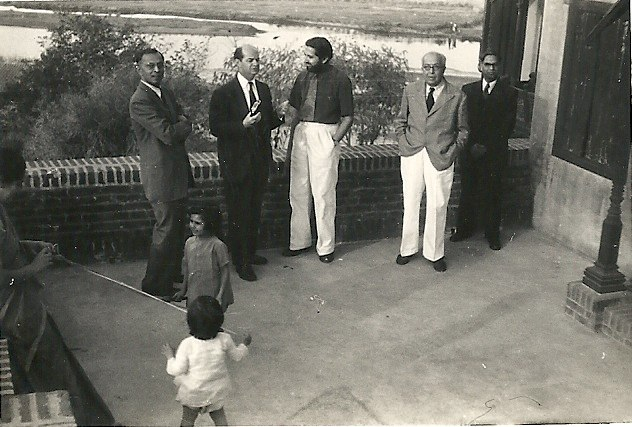
Gautam Sarabhai, center, with family, at Gautam's home, overlooking the Sabarmati River, in 1952. L to R: N. R. Nadkarni, Dr. Rake, Gautam Sarabhai, Ambalal Sarabhai, Dr. H. B. Sreerangachar

Gautam Sarabhai (4 March 1917 – 28 August 1995) was an industrialist and businessman from the Sarabhai family of Ahmedabad.

== Birth ==
Gautam was born to industrialist Seth Ambalal Sarabhai and Sarladevi on 4 March 1917 in Gujarati Jain Business Family. He was the fifth child and second son of the couple. His elder brother was Surhid and younger was Vikram Sarabhai, the father of the Indian space program.

== Family ==
He was married to Kamalini Sarabhai, a trained psychoanalyst from Tavistock Clinic and the founder of BM Institute of Mental Health. The couple has two daughters named Shyama and Mana Sarabhai Brearly. Cricketer Mike Brearley is Gautam Sarabhai's son-in-law.

== Career ==
Gautam Sarabhai joined Calico in 1940 as a director at the age of 22. With his keen sense of initiative, entrepreneurial talent and an innate financial acumen, he succeeded his father as chairman of the company in 1945. He took control of other group companies after death of his elder brother Surhid Sarabhai in 1945, while Vikram Sarabhai was involved in developing India's space program.

He expanded the textile mills and diversified the group into chemicals, plastics and fibres, harnessing modern technology to meet the challenge of the future. He not only looked after the Calico Mills but also helped start the National Institute of Design along with his sister Gira Sarabhai in 1961. The group suffered a setback in 1980s due to family feud also arose between the next of the kin of his brothers and Gautam and Surhid Jr and Kartikeya Sarabhai were ousted from management in 1982 by Gautam Sarabhai.

Kamalini and Gautam also helped start The Psychotherapy Study Group and B. M. Institute of Mental Health.

He was an avid lover of arts and had a collection of statues and paintings.

== Death ==
He died on 28 August 1995. After his death, the Sarabhai group came into the hands of Kartikeya Sarabhai.
