= Lois Barclay Murphy =

American psychologist

- Born: March 23, 1902
- Died: December 24, 2003 (aged 101)
- Occupation: Developmental Psychologist
- Spouse: Gardner Murphy
- Awards: {{G. Stanley Hall Award, Dolly Madison Award}}

Lois Barclay Murphy (March 23, 1902 – December 24, 2003) was an American developmental psychologist who had an important impact on the study of normal child development. Murphy was instrumental in changing the ways in which children were viewed in psychology—previous work tended to focus on pathology, while Murphy emphasized more positive and social elements, including normal development and the development of empathy and ethics in children. She collaborated on 16 works with her husband, Gardner Murphy, published a book about his work after his death as well as several on her own work. She founded the Early Childhood Center (EEC), a college laboratory school focused on child development, at Sarah Lawrence College in 1937 which is still in operation today. Murphy was presented with the G. Stanley Hall Award in developmental psychology in recognition of her contributions to the field.

== Biography ==
Murphy was born to May (née Hartley), a teacher and Wade Barclay Barclay, a pastor. Her parents expected all of their children to make significant contributions to the world, which was then an unusual expectation of women. As the oldest of five children, she played a large role in caring for her younger siblings. Due to her parents' careers, the family moved frequently and by her 16th birthday they had moved 13 times. During this time she was struck by how different lives were for rural and urban children and observed how some were neglected and thought of poorly. She married Gardner Murphy in 1924; the couple had two children. Murphy's partnership was helpful academically; it allowed her to make great strides in her field. Murphy disliked the behaviorist approach to child psychology that was common at the time, specifically Watson's ideas about the discipline of children, so it was not until she was introduced to her future husband, Gardner Murphy, and other psychologists with less strict views that she kindled a serious interest in developmental psychology. She died of congestive heart failure at the age of 101 on December 24, 2003.

== Career focus ==
Murphy graduated Phi Beta Kappa with a major in economics and minors in religion and psychology from Vassar in 1923. Her honors thesis investigated life at a girls' reform school; the investigation exposed her to a bitter, almost prison-like environment. The school did not reform girls, but Murphy's investigative thesis helped reform the institution. She obtained her master's degree from Union Theological Seminary in New York City in 1928, and became a founding faculty member at Sarah Lawrence College in Bronxville, where she taught Comparative Religions.

She stayed only a year, and in 1929 enrolled in Columbia College in the graduate psychology program. She earned her doctorate in 1937 and her dissertation was the basis of a book, Social behavior and child personality (1937). Murphy's research ran counter to the behaviorist perspectives of John B. Watson, which were dominant at the time. Watson's ideas on children were much respected, but Murphy stood her ground with her research since she thought Watson did not really understand children.

In order to explore her ideas on child psychology further, she returned to Sarah Lawrence College in 1937 and founded The Nursery School, a laboratory where she could research children's personality development. Murphy looked at the positive aspects of social development, such as the origin of sympathy. In 1941, she became The Nursery School's first director. The year she became director, she published Methods for the Study of Personality in Young Children, which was based on the research undertaken at The Nursery School. "Theories of free-play, Rorschach analysis of children, and the application of the Miniature Life Toy Technique were all explored during her time at the school." Later, she combined many sources of data in a single case, a case study of one child at The Nursery School, Colin: A Normal Child (1956). While she was at Sarah Lawrence College she also published, Emotional Factors in Learning (1944) and Achievement in the College Years (1960).

In 1952, Murphy and her husband both accepted positions at the Menninger Foundation in Topeka Kansas. The foundation then consisted of a clinic, sanatorium, and a school of psychiatry and Murphy became coordinator of the Coping Project for the foundation. The research project on how children deal with the stress of growing up received funding from the National Institute of Mental Health. In 1976, she published her findings as Vulnerability, Coping and Growth from Infancy to Adolescence. While based in Topeka, she was a consultant on the new Head Start program and was the chair of the Governor's Preschool Committee.

Murphy stayed in Topeka until 1968, when she and her husband obtained positions in Washington D.C. Murphy took a position as a research consultant at the Children's Hospital in Washington during her stay in the capital, until her husband died in 1979. She was a guest scientist at the National Institutes of Health during this period.

In 1981, she received the G. Stanley Hall Award from the American Psychological Association for her work in developmental psychology. Additionally, she was a member of organizations such as the Society for the Psychological Study of Social Issues, American Orthopsychiatry Association, and the New York Academy of Sciences.

== Legacy ==
Murphy believed research on children focused too much on aggression and conflict in the years following the first World War resulting in her basing her work against the then current of child developmental studies by exploring sympathy and other positive aspects of a child's social progress. As part of her research, Murphy developed a preschool at Sarah Lawrence College, where she and her research team utilized projective, open-ended and even unstructured tasks to assess children's personalities, instead of using traditional laboratory tests that were more likely to frustrate the children. While this approach was not universally accepted, Murphy's methods widened the boundaries of what were considered appropriate methods for studying child development.

Following the deaths of Henry Ladd, Eugene Lerner, and Anna Hartoch, three of Murphy's close friends, she expanded her research and founded the study of coping, which was not an area of study until after her work. She published a collected volume of her work on coping in 1976, titled Vulnerability, Coping and Growth.

In addition to her work within the field of psychology, Murphy was active in work related to other social programs. In 1950, Murphy helped found the B.M. Institute of Child Development and Mental Health in Ahmedabad, India, and in the 1960s she was instrumental in developing the Head Start program as part of President Lyndon B. Johnson's War on Poverty.

Throughout her years as a researcher, Murphy published 16 books, many of which have a deep focus on developmental properties of infants and young children. Murphy is recognized as one of the first to document feelings of sympathy in preschoolers. For her contributions to the field of psychology, and child care and development, Murphy received many awards, including the G. Stanley Hall Award and the Dolly Madison Award of the National Center of Clinical Infant programs.

Murphy is best known for expanding the study of child development to include more positive social aspects. As she said herself: "I hope that insofar as I am remembered, it would be as a person who tried to conceptualize and communicate positive aspects of children's development in integrated terms."
