= Alexander Gunn (doctor) =

Scottish physician (1845–1914)

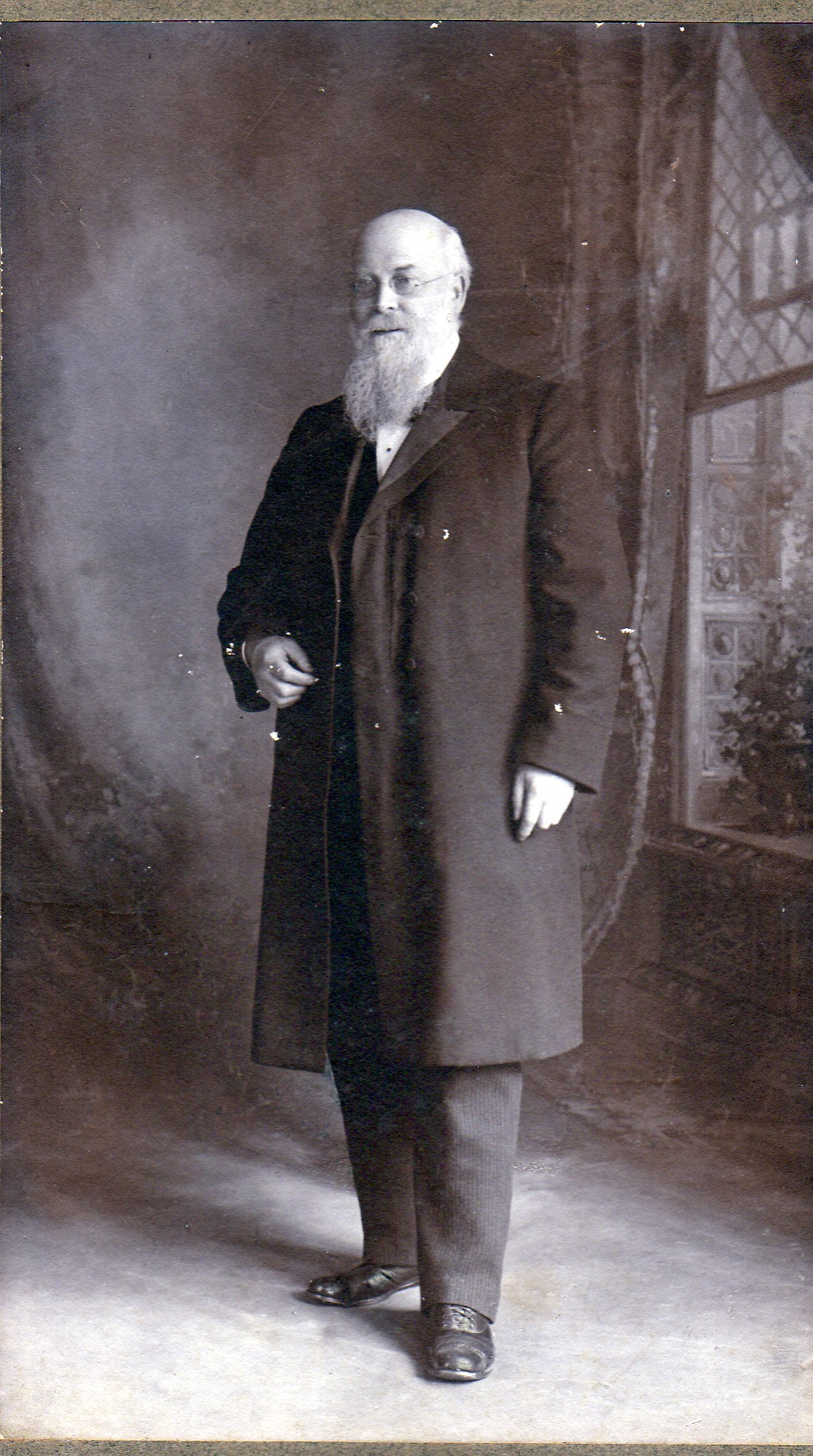
- Born: 1845; Lybster, Caithness, Scotland
- Died: 28 March 1914 (aged 68–69); Edinburgh, Scotland
- Education: St Andrews University; Royal College of Surgeons; Edinburgh University
- Known for: Surgical sterile techniques
- Scientific career
- Fields: Medicine
- Workplaces: Royal Infirmary of Edinburgh; Private Practice medical officer to the Amalgamated Society of Engineers

Alexander Gunn (1845–1914) was a Scottish physician. Through his early association with Joseph Lister, 1st Baron Lister at the Royal Infirmary of Edinburgh, he was one of the first doctors to champion the use antiseptic surgery.

== Early life ==
He was born in 1845 at Lybster in Caithness, Scotland, where his parents Robert and Christina Gunn kept a hotel. He went South to Edinburgh at the age of 14. His early career there was spent qualifying himself as a chemist and druggist under Dr Robertson of George Street in Edinburgh.

== Professional career ==
After his early training as a chemist he was appointed senior apothecary and dispenser to the Royal Infirmary of Edinburgh. He spent ten years in this post during which time he attended classes at Edinburgh University and the Royal College of Surgeons with a view to gaining medical qualifications. In 1877, aged 33, he took the diploma of Licentiate of the Royal College of Physicians (LRCP) and the S. Edin diploma and nine years later in 1886 he graduated with his Doctorate of Medicine from St. Andrews University.

He then entered private practice and acted as medical officer to the Amalgamated Society of Engineers.

He first became involved with Joseph Lister's work and discoveries in the development of the antiseptic system in surgery, while they both worked at the Royal Infirmary of Edinburgh. He subsequently championed and used the new principles of antiseptic medicine. His reputation in this field was subsequently recognised in his obituary in the British Medical Journal or BMJ

== Private life ==
He married Jean Baikie (1853 -1913) and they ultimately settled in 44 George Square, Edinburgh on what is now the site of the 1967 Basil Spence Edinburgh University Library. They had two sons and three daughters (George, Bertie, Christina, Jean and Meta). According to the 1905 valuation role Dr Gunn built up a considerable property portfolio including a tenement block and a number of houses, however at the time of his death the family were left without means. Their daughter, Jean (1887-1975), had to have her fare paid to India so that she could marry her childhood friend Andrew Geddis.

Gunn died of cancer and is buried in the Grange Cemetery in Edinburgh.
