= Sarah Lawrence College =

Private liberal arts college in Yonkers, New York, US

- Motto: Wisdom with Understanding
- Type: Private liberal arts college
- Established: 1926; 100 years ago
- Academic affiliations: Annapolis Group; Oberlin Group
- Endowment: US$156.7 million (2025)
- President: Cristle Collins Judd
- Academic staff: 97 FT/ 200 PT (2023)
- Students: 1,743 (2023)
- Undergraduates: 1,521 (2023)
- Postgraduates: 222 (2023)
- Location: Yonkers, New York, U.S. 40°56′06″N 73°50′42″W
- Campus: 44 acres (18 ha); Suburban
- Colors: Green and white
- Sporting affiliations: NCAA Division III – Skyline Conference
- Mascot: Gryphons
- Website: sarahlawrence.edu
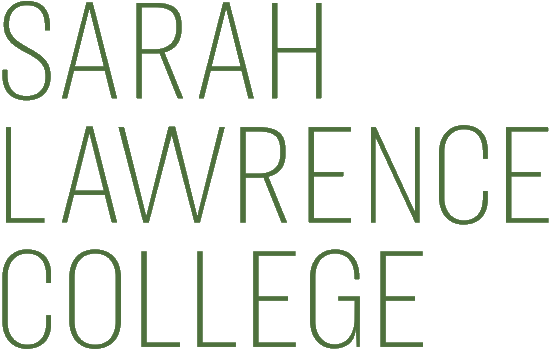

Sarah Lawrence College (SLC) is a private liberal arts college in Yonkers, New York, United States. Founded as a women's college in 1926, Sarah Lawrence College has been coeducational since 1968. The college's campus maintains a Bronxville mailing address and sits roughly 20 miles (32 km) north of Midtown Manhattan, in Westchester County. The college's pedagogy draws from the progressive education model, including emphasis on personalized academic study.

== History ==
=== Establishment and development (20th century) ===
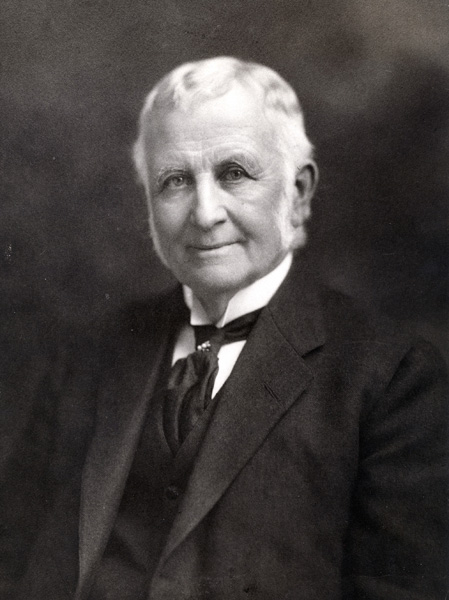
William Van Duzer Lawrence

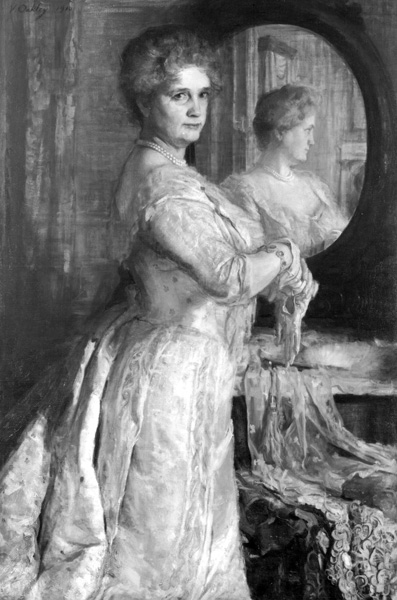
Sarah Lawrence

Sarah Lawrence College was established in 1926 by the real-estate mogul William Van Duzer Lawrence on the grounds of his estate in Westchester County and was named in honor of his wife, Sarah Bates Lawrence. The college was originally intended to provide instruction in the arts and humanities for women. A major component of the college's early curriculum was "productive leisure", wherein students were required to work for eight hours weekly in such fields as modeling, shorthand, typewriting, applying makeup, and gardening. Its pedagogy combined independent research projects which were individually supervised by the teaching faculty, and seminars with low student-to-faculty ratio, a pattern that it retains to the present. Sarah Lawrence was the first liberal arts college in the United States to incorporate a rigorous approach to the arts with the principles of progressive education, focusing on the primacy of teaching and the concentration of curricular efforts on individual needs.

Harold Taylor, President of Sarah Lawrence College from 1945 to 1959, influenced the college. Taylor was elected president at age 30, maintained a friendship with the educational philosopher John Dewey, and worked to employ the Dewey method at Sarah Lawrence. Taylor spent much of his career calling for educational reform in the United States, using Sarah Lawrence as an example of the possibilities of a personalized, modern, and rigorous approach to higher education.

Sarah Lawrence became a coeducational institution in 1968. Prior to this transition, there were discussions about relocating the school and merging it with Princeton University, but the administration opted to remain independent.

=== Larry Ray scandal (2010) ===
Starting in September 2010, after being released from prison, Larry Ray (then 50) resided in the on-campus student housing dormitory apartment of his daughter, Talia Ray, in Slonim Woods Building 9. At the time, Talia was a sophomore at the college, and lived in the dorm with seven other students. Sarah Lawrence College later told New York Magazine that it was not aware that he had been living on campus. While there, Ray started a sex cult in which he presented himself to students as a former U.S. Marine with training in psychological operations. In 2011, he induced some students to move into the apartment of Lee Chen in nearby New York City. In 2013, four of Ray's victims graduated from Sarah Lawrence. In February 2020, he was charged by prosecutors in Manhattan with conspiracy, extortion, sex trafficking, forced labor, and other related offenses, following nearly 10 years of alleged transgressions with students and former students. Ray was convicted on all counts and sentenced to 60 years in prison.

=== College presidents ===
The first president of the college was Marion Coats, serving from 1924 to 1929. She was a friend of Vassar College president Henry MacCracken and William Van Duzer Lawrence. Coats had traditional views of women's role in society that were at odds with her progressive approach to women's education. Cristle Collins Judd was introduced as president in 2017.

== Academic rankings ==
Academic rankings

Liberal arts
- U.S. News & World Report: 108
- Washington Monthly: 155

National
- Forbes: 467
- WSJ/College Pulse: 200

As Sarah Lawrence College dropped its SAT test score submission requirement for its undergraduate applicants in 2003, thus joining the SAT optional movement for undergraduate admission, the college does not have SAT data to send to U.S. News for its national survey. Of this decision, Myers states, "We are a writing-intensive school, and the information produced by SAT scores added little to our ability to predict how a student would do at our college; it did, however, do much to bias admission in favor of those who could afford expensive coaching sessions." At the time, Sarah Lawrence was the only American college that completely disregarded SAT scores in its admission process. A 2007 article in The Washington Post reported that without an SAT score U.S. News would "make up a number" to use in its magazines, and argued that the school's ranking would be artificially decreased. Sarah Lawrence College now maintains a test-optional policy.

On June 19, 2007, following a meeting of the Annapolis Group, which represents over 100 liberal arts colleges, Sarah Lawrence announced that it would join others who had previously signed the letter to college presidents asking them not to participate in the "reputation survey" section of the U.S. News & World Report survey (this section comprises 25% of the ranking). The 2019 edition ranked Sarah Lawrence tied for the 65th best liberal arts college in the nation.

In 2022, Forbes rated it 467th out of 660 in its America's Top Colleges ranking. That same year, Washington Monthly rankings ranked Sarah Lawrence 155th in the liberal arts college category.

== Undergraduate admissions ==
In 2024, Sarah Lawrence accepted 49.9% of undergraduate applicants, with admission standards considered exceptional, applicant competition considered average, and with those admitted having an average 3.75 high school GPA. The college does not require submission of standardized test scores, Sarah Lawrence being a test optional school. Those accepted that submitted test scores had an average 1360 SAT score (15% submitting scores) or average 31 ACT score (6% submitting scores).

== Political involvement and activism ==
Political activism has played a role in forming the Sarah Lawrence community since the early years of the college. As early as 1938, students were volunteering in working-class sections of Yonkers, New York to help bring equality and educational opportunities to poor and minority citizens, and the Sarah Lawrence College War Board, organized by students in the fall of 1942, sought to aid troops fighting in World War II. 204 of 293 students signed up as volunteers during the first week of the War Board. During the so-called McCarthy Years, a number of Sarah Lawrence's faculty members were accused by the American Legion of being sympathetic to the Communist Party, and were called before the Jenner Committee.

Since that time, activism has played a central role in student life, with movements for civil rights and against the Vietnam War in the 1960s and for student and faculty diversity in the 1980s. Also in the 1960s, students established an Upward Bound program for students from lower-income and poverty areas to prepare for college. Theatre Outreach, the Child Development Institute, the Empowering Teachers Program, the Community Writers program, the Office of Community Partnership, and the Fulbright High School Writers Program are among the many programs founded since the 1970s to provide services to the larger community. In the late 1980s, students occupied Westlands, the main administrative building for the campus, in a sit-in for wider diversity. Students occupied Westlands again in 2016, in a sit-in supporting improved wages and safer working conditions for the college's recently unionized facilities workers.

== Campus ==
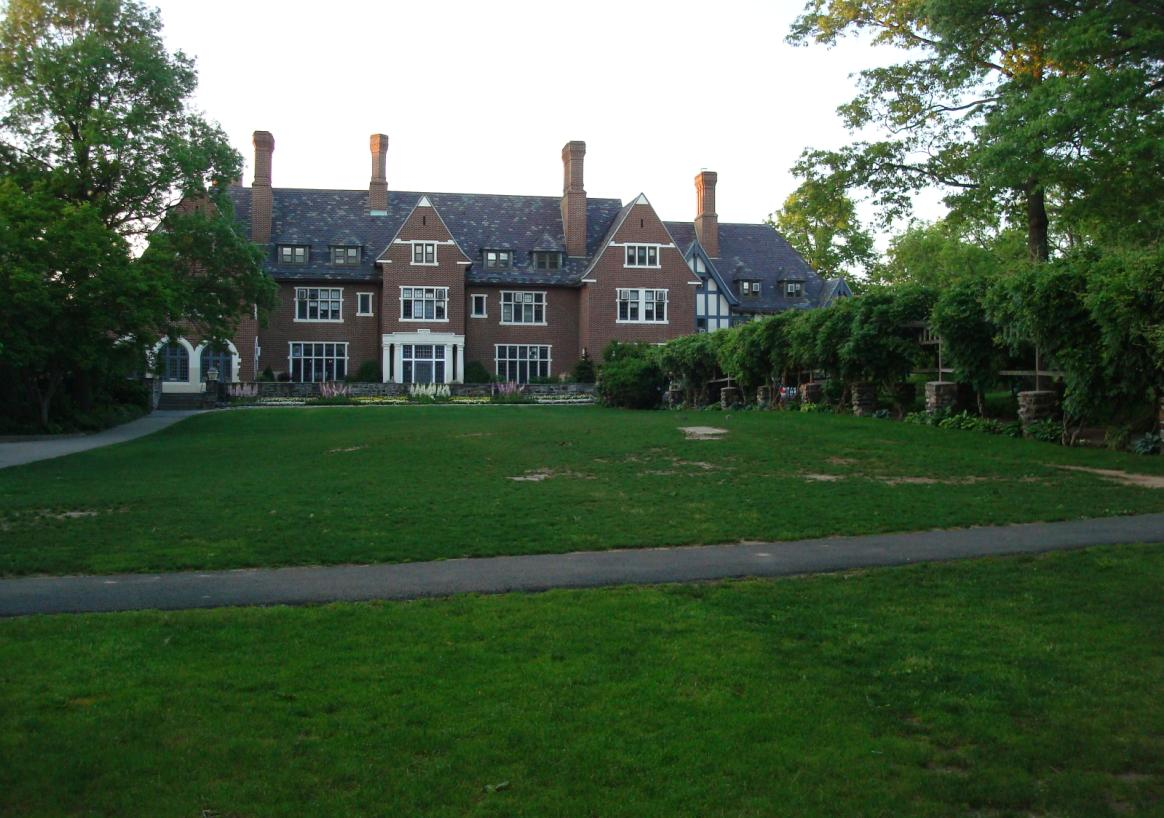
Westlands House

Much of the 42-acre (17 ha) Sarah Lawrence campus was originally a part of the estate of the college's founder, William Van Duzer Lawrence, though the college has more than doubled its size since Lawrence bequeathed his estate to the college in 1926. The terrain is characterized by outcroppings of exposed bedrock shaded by large oak and elm trees. Many of the older buildings are in the Tudor Revival architecture style that was popular in the area during the early 20th century, and many of the college's newer buildings attempt an updated interpretation of the same style. The campus is divided into two distinctive sections, the "Old Campus" and the "New Campus": the first is roughly contained within the boundaries of the former Lawrence estate, and the area of the second was acquired sometime after the college's earliest years.

The area outside the original Lawrence estate holds the college's newer facilities. Several century-old, Tudor-style mansions among the newer additions, including Andrews, Tweed, Lynd, Marshall Field, and Slonim House: each was once a private estate, purchased by the college during periods of growth and expansion. The more modest Tudor houses along Mead Way, which also had been private residences, now serve as dormitories for students at the college. "Slonim Woods" is a group of newer, townhouse-style dormitories, built on the grounds of Slonim House.

The Campbell Sports Center was constructed in 1998 in response to an increased focus on physical fitness and sports. This facility includes an indoor pool, gymnasium, track, squash courts, and weight rooms.

In 2004, the college completed construction of a modern visual arts facility, the Monika A. and Charles A. Heimbold Visual Arts Center, with environmentally friendly aspects which earned the college national press attention. Just down the road is Hill House, a six-story apartment building purchased by the college in the late 1990s that now lodges students. Across the street from Hill House is the large Wrexham house, also in the Tudor style, which the college purchased from the government of Rwanda in 2004; this building, once home to the Rwandan consul, has been renovated and is used for various postgraduate programs. At the opposite end of the campus stands the Science and Mathematics Center, completed in 1994.

=== Buildings ===
Campus buildings

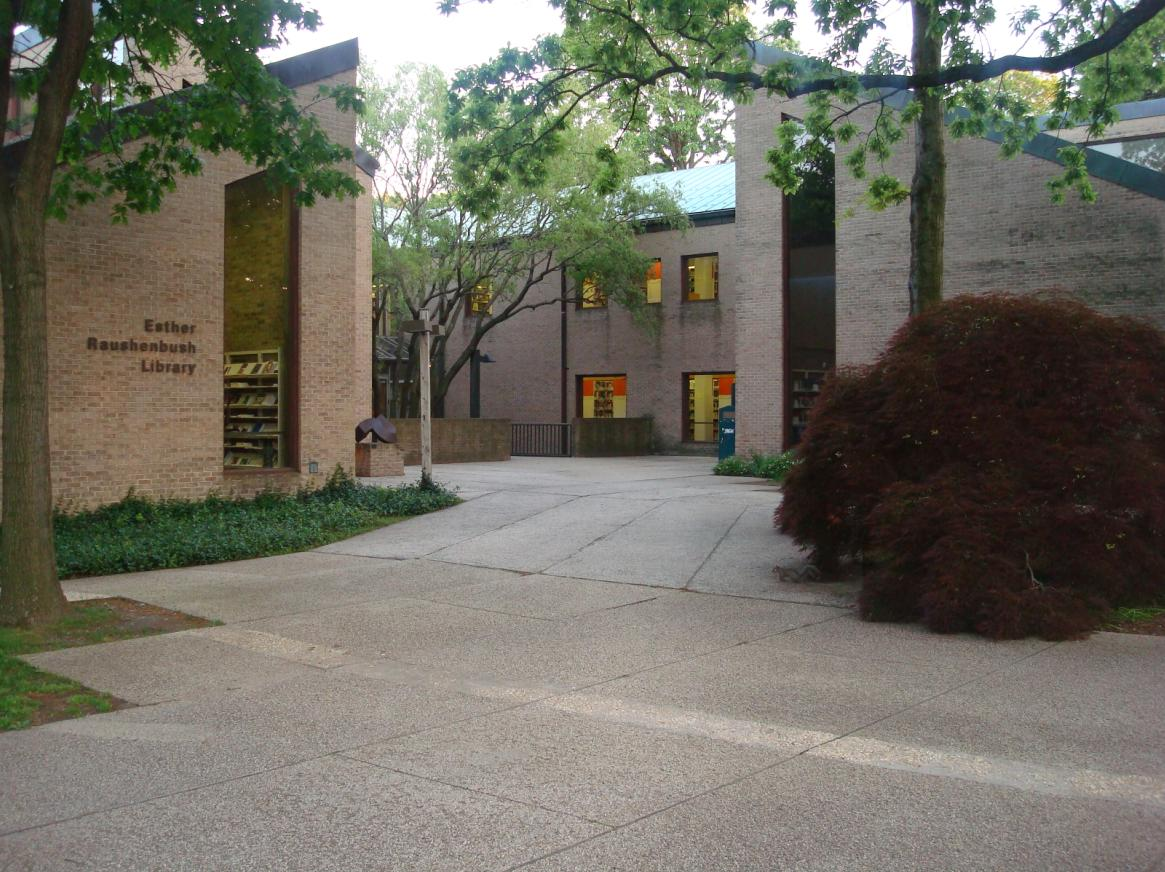
The Esther Raushenbush Library

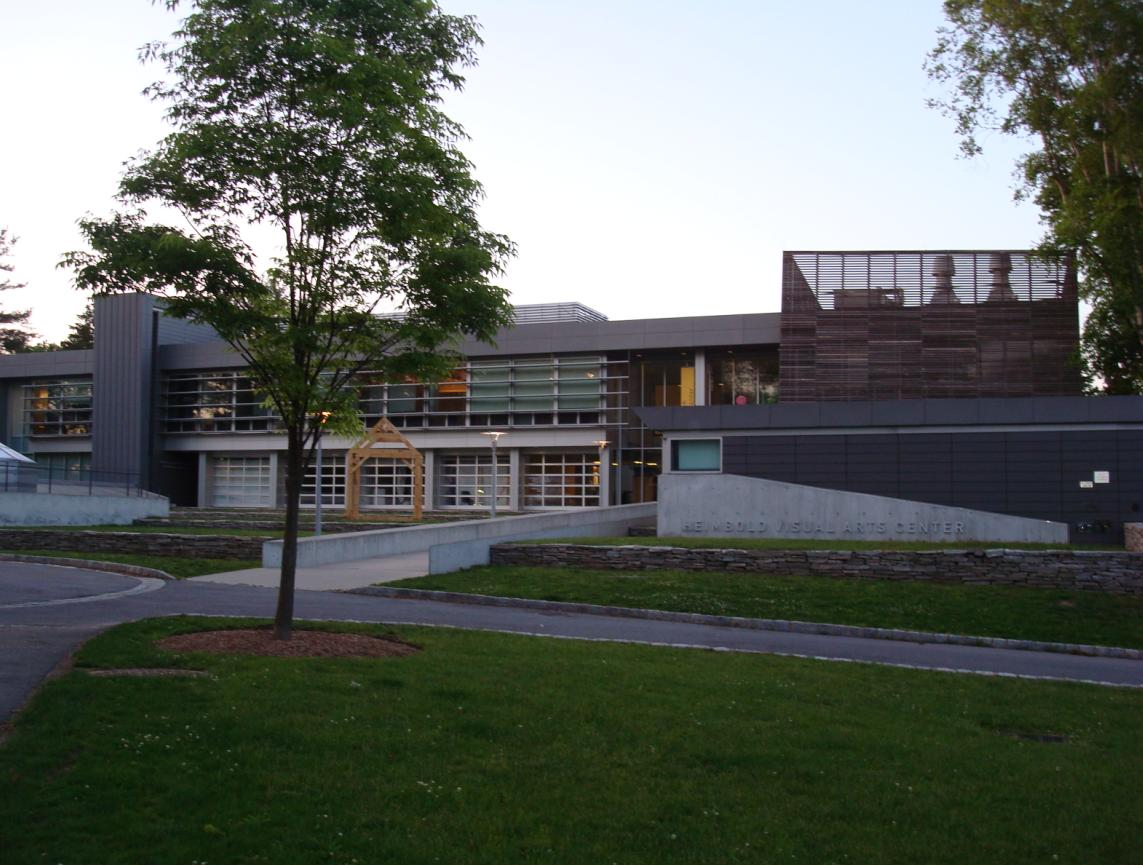
Heimbold Visual Arts Center

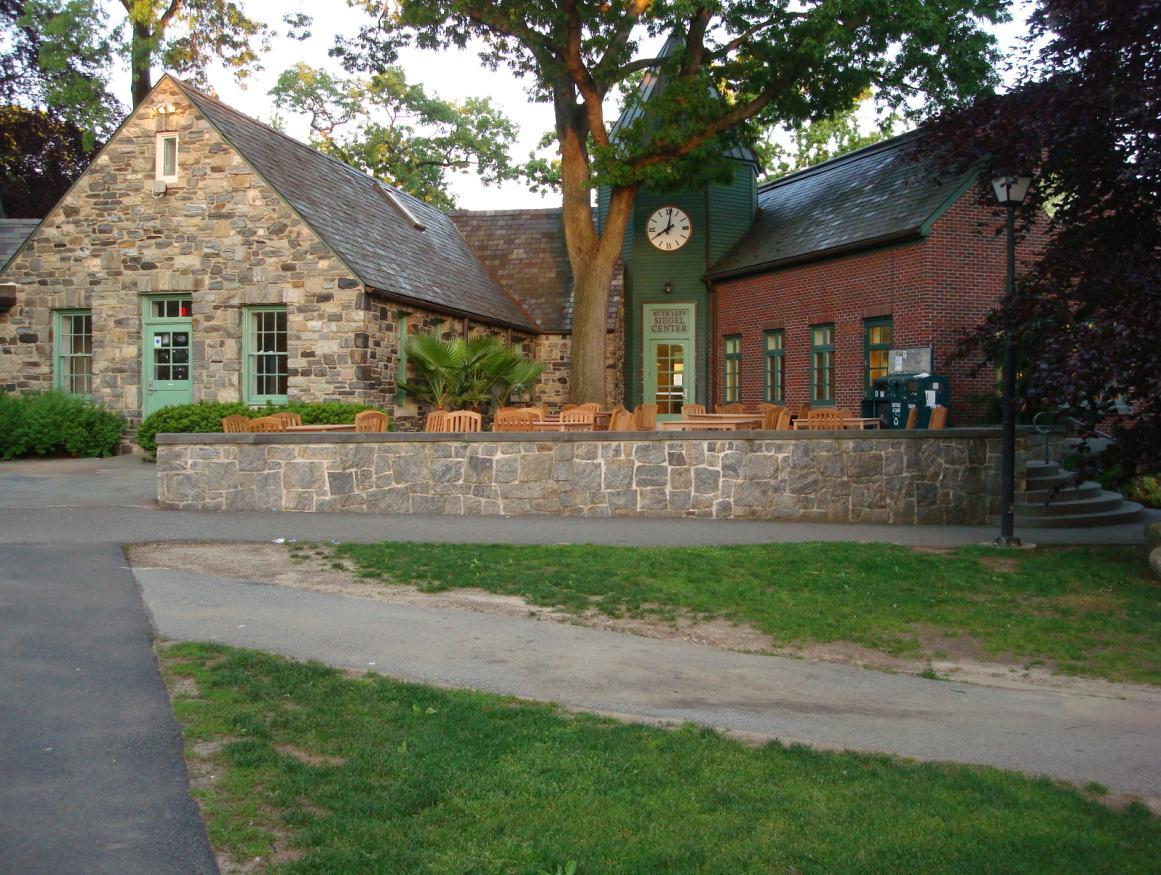
Siegel Student Center

Westlands

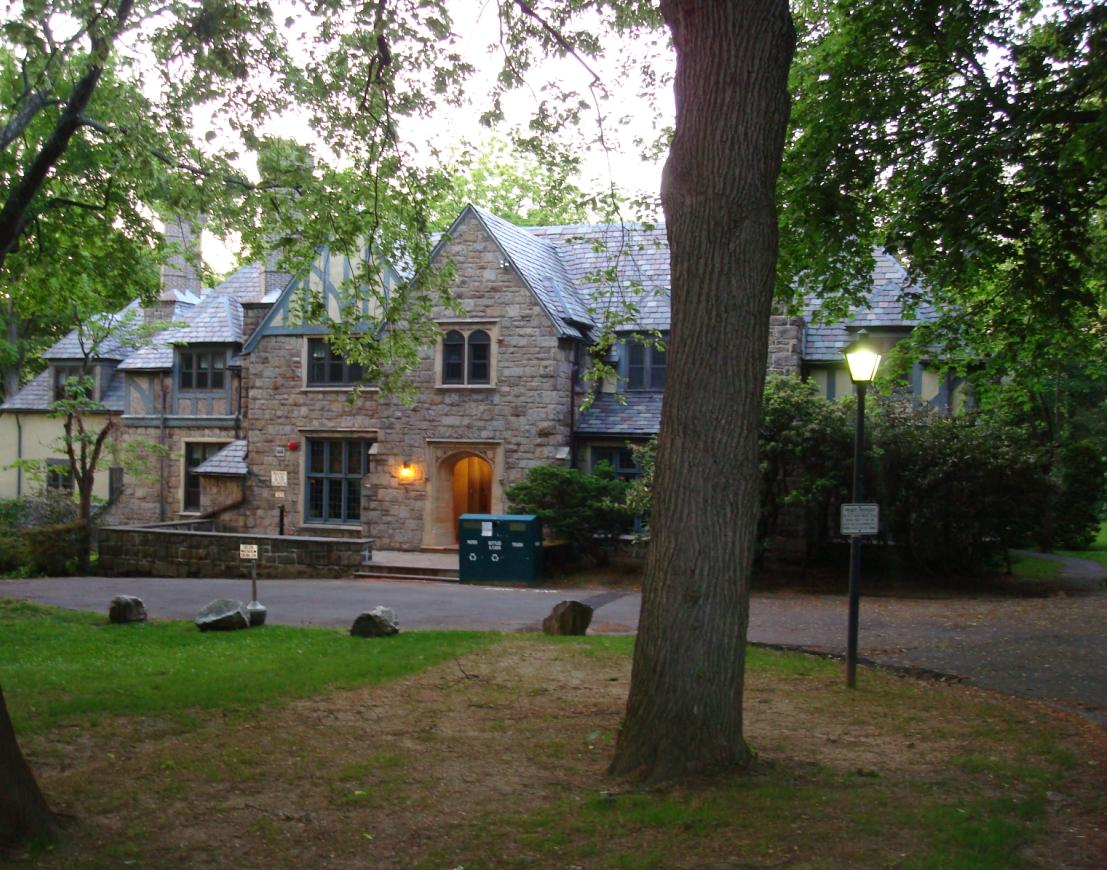
Tweed House

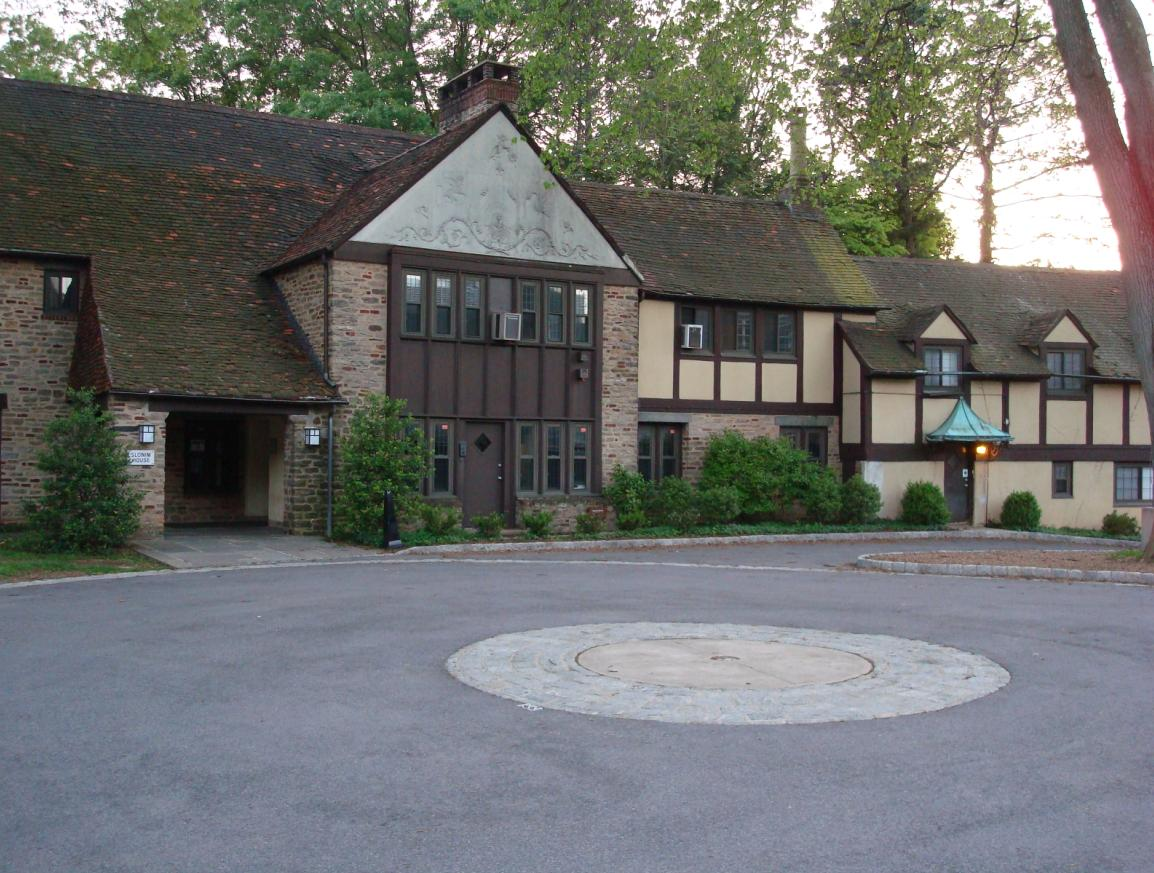
Slonim House

North Lawn and old dorms

Marshall Field

The Tea Haus

Center campus

==== Academic facilities ====
- The Barbara Walters Campus Center is the newest building on campus. Finished in the fall of 2019, the building is named for alumna Barbara Walters. The building is a multipurpose space which is used for dances, speeches, class gatherings, etc. On the second floor is the Barbara Walters Reading Room. It includes a rotating exhibition, but currently holds artifacts from Barbara Walters' life. The building has a green roof energy efficient LED lighting.
- Bates Center for Student Life is one of the original campus buildings. Designed in the English Tudor style that was begun by Bates and How and extended by Penrose Stout in the 1930's. It housed offices and classrooms and maids' quarters to dining halls to laboratories and arts facilities. At one time, it was home to a miniature basketball court that is now a faculty dining room, though the lines of the court can still be seen on the floors. Over the years, programs in science, visual arts, and physical education have grown to the point that they also are elsewhere on the campus, requiring three buildings of their own. Bates has always been home to the college's main dining facility and also houses the popular "Health Food Bar."
- The Esther Raushenbush Library, designed in 1974 by Walter, Burns, Toan & Lundein in a modern architectural style with implied buttresses and features of its much older neighbor, Andrews House. The Raushenbush Library houses over 300,000 volumes.
- The Alice Stone Ilchman Science and Mathematics Center, completed in 1994, is situated on the far north end of the campus. It houses science laboratories in addition to classrooms and faculty offices. The building is named for former president Alice Stone Ilchman.
- The Marshall Field Music Building was originally created as part of William Lawrence's residential neighborhood, Lawrence Park West. Built in the Georgian Colonial style by Dwight Baum it was situated on 3 acres (1.2 ha) of landscaped land when the college purchased it in 1960 to house the music department and to provide additional student housing. Prior to the purchase, President Harold Taylor played his clarinet in several of the rooms to test the acoustics.
- The Monica A. and Charles A. Heimbold Visual Arts Center The building was designed by Polshek Partnership Architects chief architect Susan Rodriguez. Completed in 2004, the building uses the landscape and existing campus circulation patterns. For its inventive use of materials, consistent development of the project in relation to the original concept, integrated plan/section, and use of building siting, solar orientation, daylighting, and locally quarried fieldstone to achieve LEED certification, The American Institute of Architects awarded a special 'Sustainable Architecture Honor Award' to the project as well as First Honor Awards at its 2005 "Celebration of Architecture".
- The Campbell Sports Center – One of the newest buildings on campus, the Sports Center was completed in 1997 and houses a swimming pool, a rowing tank, a weight room and exercise center, an indoor running track, squash courts, a basketball court, classrooms, locker rooms, and administrative offices.
- The Charles DeCarlo Performing Arts Center, remodeled and expanded in 1974 from the original 1950's design of Marcel Breuer. It is located on the western end of the South Lawn. Named for former College president Charles DeCarlo, the complex comprises the Bessie Schönberg Dance Theatre, the 200-seat Suzanne Werner Wright Theatre, the 400-seat Reisinger Auditorium, the 117-seat Cannon Workshop Theatre modeled after Shakespeare's Globe Theatre, and rehearsal spaces and work areas. The college bookstore is located in the PAC.
- The Ruth Leff Siegel Center, which is referred to as "The Pub", was originally constructed as a gardener's cottage on the Lawrence estate, then used as an infirmary and later as a faculty house. When the college began admitting male students in 1968, it became temporary housing for men. During the 1970s, the space was remodeled and christened "The Pub" for use as an informal dining hall and as a space for student activities. During the 1980s, it was renamed "Charlie's Place", honoring former President DeCarlo. In 1998, the entire structure was renovated, an addition was built by the architects Buttrick White & Burtis, and the new complex took on its current official name. Today, it houses primarily a café serving on-the-go food, as well as two TV lounges.
- The Tea House, also known as the "Tea Haus", because its façade evokes German architectural motifs, was originally a gazebo built by the Lawrence family on a small rocky hill on the north lawn of their estate. After being saved by a student petition from a demolition that was called for by architect Philip Johnson in 1960, it was converted to an enclosed building with large windows and a fireplace that now houses a café selling a variety of teas and baked goods. While the building housed the office of history faculty member Charles Trinkaus from the 1950s through 1970, there seems to be no evidence to support the campus rumor that the Tea House was once the office of long-time faculty member Joseph Campbell.

==== Administration buildings ====
- Andrews Annex, built in the 1990s adjacent to Andrews House, houses a number of administrative offices.
- Lyles House is home to the college's Health Services Center.
- The President's House, built in 1921 and designed by architect Lewis Bowman is an example of "stockbroker Tudor-Elizabethan." Typical of Bowman are the ornate chimneys, tower like entrance pavilion and graceful treatment of the garden facade. Its living room features restored carved beams, representing the various trades, from a 16th-century Tudor mansion in England. Additionally, above the mantel a Christian creation story is told in intricate wood carving. Campus legend dictates that a secret panel exists in the living room leading to a wine cellar, which was built during Prohibition. The President's House has housed the college's presidents since 1954, when the first President's House, located north of campus, was demolished to make way for the Sprain Brook Parkway.
- Robinson House on Mead Way is home to the college's communications department. Until 1952, it housed "The Caf", a student coffee shop, on its main floor.
- Westlands is primarily an administrative building, but its top floor houses a number of student living spaces. Completed in 1917, it is the oldest building on campus and was home to Sarah Bates Lawrence and William Van Duzer Lawrence before being given to the college. Dynamically situated at the highest point of elevation on the campus, it is a notable example of Victorian/Tudor architecture inspired by British architect Norman Shaw and designed by the New York/Bronxville firm Bates & How. When completed the home was pictured on the front page of the New York Times. It has been the heart of the campus throughout the history of the college and, owing to its massive size, it now houses the president's offices, the Office of Admission, the Office of Financial Aid, the Office of the Registrar, the Office of International Programs, the Career Counseling Office, the offices of all of the college's deans, and a number of meeting spaces in addition to the top-floor dorms.
- The Wrexham Road Property, acquired by the college in 2004, is a large manor house that once belonged to the government of Rwanda and used as a home for its consul. The building currently houses various graduate-level programs.

==== Housing ====
- Andrews House, a former manor house purchased for $200,000 by the college in 1935 from Arthur Lawrence, a son of the college's founders, is known for its high ceilings, fireplaces, and its spiraling main staircase. The house is designed in the Germantown Colonial Style by architect Penrose Stout in 1926. The majority of the building houses students, but it is also the home of the college's Department of Operations and Facilities and to the offices of Writing faculty.
- Andrews Court refers to the twelve cottage-style buildings to the south of Andrews House. Built in 1974, the buildings have, on average, about eight units each in addition to full kitchens, living rooms, and bathrooms.
- Tweed, a former manor house, is home to a number of large dorm rooms in addition to a pair of classrooms.
- Curtis is home to a number of dorms, and is also part of the Early Childhood Education complex.
- Lynd House, another former mansion, designed by Harrie Lindeberg in 1931. It is home to mostly living spaces. The building's adjacent carriage house has been converted into student housing.
- Hill House, bought by the college in the late 1990s, is a seven-story apartment building on the extreme southern end of the campus. At present, the majority of the apartments in the building are occupied by students, but a number of them remain in the possession of the original tenants who occupied them when the building was purchased by Sarah Lawrence. Most of the apartments are quite large and each has a full kitchen. Apartments on the upper floors with south-facing windows have, on clear days, a view of the Empire State Building.
- Kober also designed by Penrose Stout in 1933. It is home to dorm rooms, but is also a part of the Early Childhood Education complex. It was donated to the college in 1951 by Otto Frohnknecht in memory of his daughter, Margaret Frohnknecht Kober, who graduated from Sarah Lawrence in 1935. There was once a bowling alley in its basement.
- Morrill is the former maid's quarters to the President's House, and now is home to faculty offices.
- Slonim House was formerly a manor house designed by Harrie Lindeberg that is now occupied by dorms and by the college's Center for Continuing Education and Office of Graduate Studies.
- Slonim Woods is the group of 10 purpose-built living facilities constructed in 1977. They consist of eight single person dorm rooms arranged around a central communal living space.

===== Old dorms =====
The "Old dorms" refer to four original purpose-built student housing structures to the immediate north of Westlands in what is frequently referred to as the "central campus". Dudley Lawrence, one of the sons of William and Sarah Lawrence, achieved the remarkable feat of constructing three of these buildings in one year (1926–1927). The halls were designed by Bates and How using a more traditional Neo-Tudor style through the use of stone and timber materials, and mansard roofs. The interiors are also in keeping with the architectural style found on most of the older buildings in the area, with thick plaster walls, hardwood floors, and leaded windows (since replaced with more energy-efficient double-pane windows). MacCracken, built a few years later than the other three, is situated to the south of Dudley Lawrence. The original elegant living rooms that were found in each building, excepting MacCracken, are now used as classrooms.

- Dudley Lawrence, houses two classrooms in addition to living spaces. It is named for William Lawrence's son, who oversaw the construction of the Old Dorms.
- OSilas, originally named Gilbert for one of the college's original trustees, is the northernmost building of the four and is known for being quiet and populated with the college's more studious set.
- MacCracken, named for Vassar College president Henry Noble MacCracken, is a few years younger than its neighbors and has, at various times, housed the college library, the bookstore, and a number of other facilities in addition to living spaces. Although it still serves as a dormitory, it now also houses dance studios, meeting spaces, and administrative offices.
- Titsworth is an all-girls dorm and was also named for one of the college's founding trustees. It occupies the space between Gilbert and Dudley Lawrence and is also home to the Titsworth Lecture Hall.

===== New dorms =====
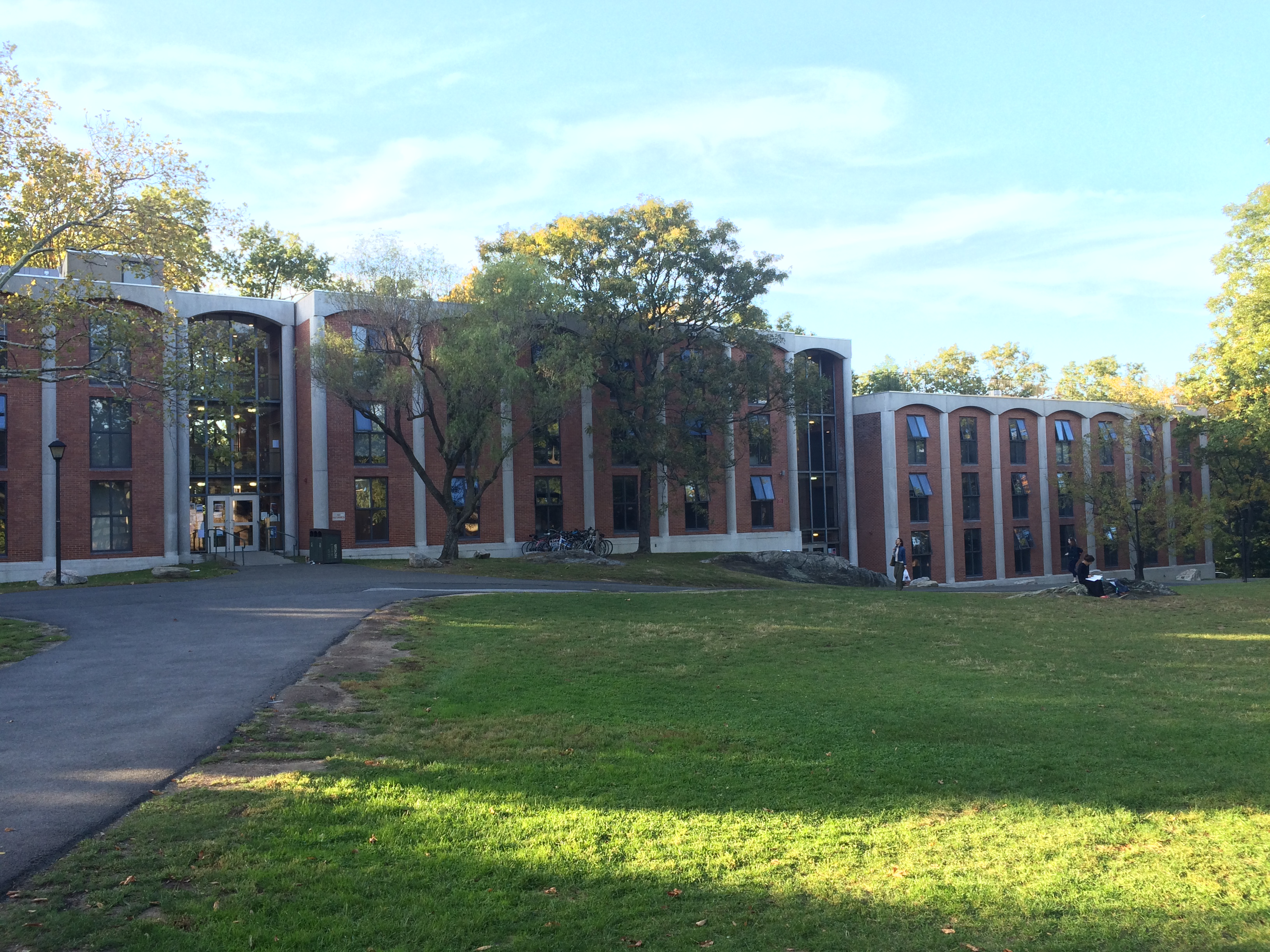
Rothschild, Garrison, and Taylor (left to right)

Designed by the renowned architect Philip Johnson and combining the lighter brick of Westlands with concrete slender "post modern" arches and modernist glass atria, the "New Dorms" were completed in 1960. The architectural style of the buildings is meant to be a modernist reflection of the three older dorms (Gilbert, Titsworth, and Dudley Lawrence) that stand on the opposite side of the North Lawn. The three buildings that comprise the New Dorms are connected by the glass atria in which the buildings' primary stairwells are found. With the exception of the large apartments in Rothschild, these dorms typically house first-year students.

- Rothschild comprises apartment style, air-conditioned dorm spaces with kitchens, living rooms, and an elevator. The basement houses a number of small classrooms and studios in use predominantly by the theater department.
- Garrison is a traditional dormitory-style building with shared bathrooms.
- Taylor is nearly a replica in the design of its neighbor, Garrison.

===== The Mead Way houses =====
The Mead Way Houses are the eight former private homes that stand along the steep hill of Mead Way on the college's eastern end. The two southernmost houses, Robinson and Swinford, are occupied by administrative offices and the studio of WSLC, the campus internet radio station, while the northernmost six houses, listed below, are reserved for student living spaces. The northern houses include:

- Brebner House
- Mansell House
- Morris House
- Perkins House
- Schmidt House
- Warren Green House

== Athletics ==
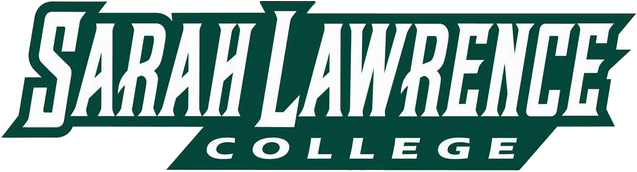
Sarah Lawrence athletics wordmark

Sarah Lawrence College is the member of Skyline Conference of NCAA Division III. The college sponsors intercollegiate teams in crew (rowing), men's and women's cross country, equestrian, men's basketball, men's and women's tennis, men's and women's volleyball, men's and women's soccer, women's softball, and men's and women's swimming. In March 2011, the college announced that it would seek membership as a Division III member of the NCAA. The college began competing as a full member of Division III in the 2015–16 academic year after receiving a waiver to the required four-year 'provisional' period.

The college left the Hudson Valley conference after the 2013–14 season and joined the Skyline Conference beginning with the 2014–15 season. The Skyline Conference contains several schools including SUNY Purchase and Yeshiva University which have played against Sarah Lawrence regularly over the past few years.

=== Mascot ===
From its beginning in 1923, Sarah Lawrence lacked an official mascot. Unofficially, the student body had long adopted the large resident population of 'Black Squirrels' as a de facto mascot to the college. The position of silent mascot that the 'Black Squirrel' occupied was endorsed by the college itself with the production of various Black Squirrel merchandise, including Sarah Lawrence clothing branded with the Black Squirrel image.

In 1998, the Gryphon was chosen as the mascot for the college's athletic teams. In 2013, the Gryphon mascot was named Godric after a campus vote "involving students, faculty, staff and alumni."
