= GAF Nomad =

Australian twin-turboprop utility airplane, 1971

Nomad
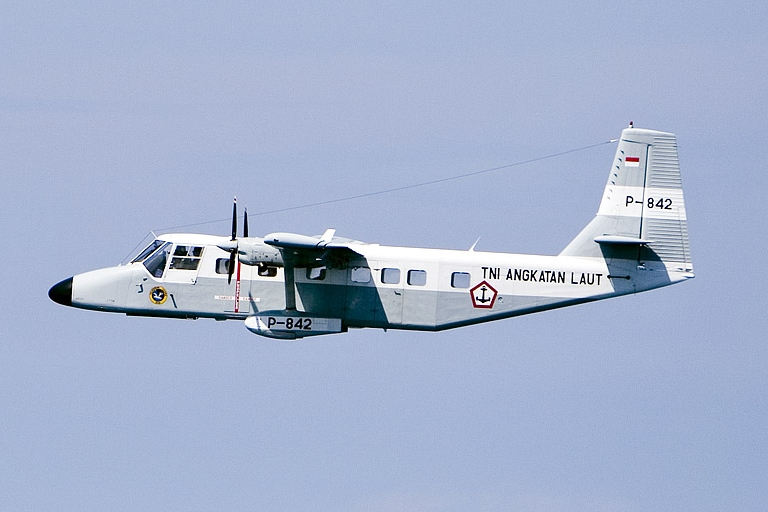
- The GAF Nomad in the N24 stretched variant

General information
- Type: Light utility aircraft
- Manufacturer: Government Aircraft Factories
- Status: In limited service
- Primary users: Philippine Air Force Australian Army (historical); Indonesian Navy (historical)
- Number built: 172

History
- Manufactured: 1975–1985
- First flight: 23 July 1971 (N-22); 5 December 1971 (N-24)
- Retired: Royal Australian Air Force (1993)

The GAF Nomad is a utility aircraft produced by the Government Aircraft Factories (GAF) of Australia in Melbourne. The twin-turboprop, high-wing aircraft has a retractable gear and came in two variants: the initial N22, followed by the stretched N24. Supported by the Australian Government, design work began in the mid-1960s, and it made its maiden flight on 23 July 1971. Despite some export sales and commercial operations, sales were not sufficient and production stopped in 1985.

The Royal Flying Doctor Service, the Australian Army and the Australian Customs Service were major users. The Australian military withdrew almost all of its remaining Nomads during the 1990s amid reports of safety concerns. By the end of the 1990s only a small number of aircraft remained in regular use in Australia.

GippsAero acquired the Australian type certificate for the Nomad in 2008 and announced plans to produce it again as the GA18. The project proceeded slowly and was ultimately stopped, with complete aircraft manufacturing at the facility ending in late 2020. In June 2025, aircraft production recommenced with the GA8 Airvan, and factory support for the Nomad continues.

== Development ==
=== Origins ===
During 1965, development of what would become the Nomad commenced at GAF, although a considerable number of projects and design studies, including a compact twin-engined utility aircraft proposed by the Commonwealth Aircraft Corporation (CAC) in the 1950s, had been conducted beforehand. In 1966, GAF contacted the Australian Army, seeking feedback on their proposal, which was of a single-engined turboprop-powered aircraft that could replace existing assets such as the American Cessna 180 and the Swiss Pilatus PC-6 Porter. The Army informed the company that, based on its combat experiences in Vietnam, the service believed a twin-engine configuration would be more useful to them. In the civil sector, an envisioned crop-dusting variant, viewed by GAF as a counterpart to the successful de Havilland Canada DHC-2 Beaver, was pitched to potential agricultural operators; they largely favoured using two engines, and noted that it ought to possess greater endurance and "hot-and-high" performance.

Based on feedback, GAF completely redesigned their proposal. This redesign was initially referred to as Project N; its basic configuration was of a twin-engined, multi-purpose transport aircraft. An original intention was that the entire rear fuselage would be hinged so that it could be swung open, providing generous rear-loading access to accommodate its target payload of a compact road vehicle; this choice necessitated the adoption of a raised cruciform tail. The new design was viewed as being a direct rival of existing products on the market from manufactures such as Britten-Norman, Shorts and de Havilland Canada. It was intended to be suitable for use by both local and overseas customers in both civil and military markets. According to aerospace periodical Flight International, it was apparent even at an early stage of the project that the programme could not be realistically accomplished without financial assistance from the Australian government, partly because the nation lacked a large domestic market.

During January 1970, the Australian government decided to provide $A3.2 million to GAF for the production of a pair of flight-capable prototypes along with a single static airframe for testing. The government was keen both to foster the growth of the nation's indigenous aviation industry and specifically to GAF to establish itself with a new aircraft in order to maintain aircraft production at the company, which was then set to end after the scheduled termination of license-produced Mirage III fighters. Furthermore, the twin-engined aircraft was viewed as a somewhat of a natural successor to the earlier DHA-3 Drover, a trimotor passenger airliner which had been built by de Havilland Australia.

=== Into flight ===
On 23 July 1971, the first prototype (registered VH-SUP) flew for the first time. By this point, the aircraft had been designated as the N2, and was being aimed at both the military and civilian markets. The designation N22 was to be used initially for military-orientated Nomads; this model, which was subsequently re-designated as N22B during production, was designed to perform military support operations, including aerial surveillance, medical evacuation, and other ancillary mission types. Furthermore, the N24A designation was assigned to a lengthened version of the Nomad; this was marketed as the principal commercial version.

On 5 December 1971, the second prototype performed its first flight. Reportedly, flight testing went relatively smoothly. A minor issue affecting the retraction of the undercarriage was quickly rectified, while directional stability was augmented by a 30 per cent increase in the area of both the fin and rudder. However, the programme was affected by a political dispute between the Army and the Royal Australian Air Force (RAAF) over whether the Army should continue to operate fixed-wing aircraft; this argument motivated the Australian Government to delay authorising production, causing several key figures of GAF's design team to resign in protest. During May 1972, production of the Nomad was finally authorised at a cost of $A13 million (£6.4 million); by this point, the Army had emerged from the row with success, being allocated 11 aircraft out of the first batch of 20 Nomads. At the same time, the conversion of one of the prototypes to represent a new stretched variant was also authorised.

In service, the Nomad was soon considered to be a problematic aircraft; early evaluations of the type performed by the military were frequently critical of it. Reportedly, safety concerns raised included fatigue issues with the tailplane, incorrect strength calculations having been used, and multiple questions surrounding the aircraft's overall aerodynamic stability and airworthiness. During August 1976, a high-profile failure occurred when a stretched-fuselage N24 variant crashed during a test flight with modifications to the tail plane, resulting in the deaths of both GAF's chief test pilot Stuart Pearce (father of actor Guy Pearce), and David Hooper, the chief structures designer. As of May 2007, the Nomad has been reportedly involved in a total of 32 total hull-loss accidents, which have cumulatively resulted in 76 fatalities.

During late 1980, by which point roughly 130 Nomads have been sold in both civil and military versions, the Australian Government gave its approval for GAF to proceed with the production of a further batch of 55 Nomads; this brought the authorised total production to 200 units, which was the forecast break-even point of the programme. In 1981, its unit cost was A$991,000.

=== Termination and prospective revival ===
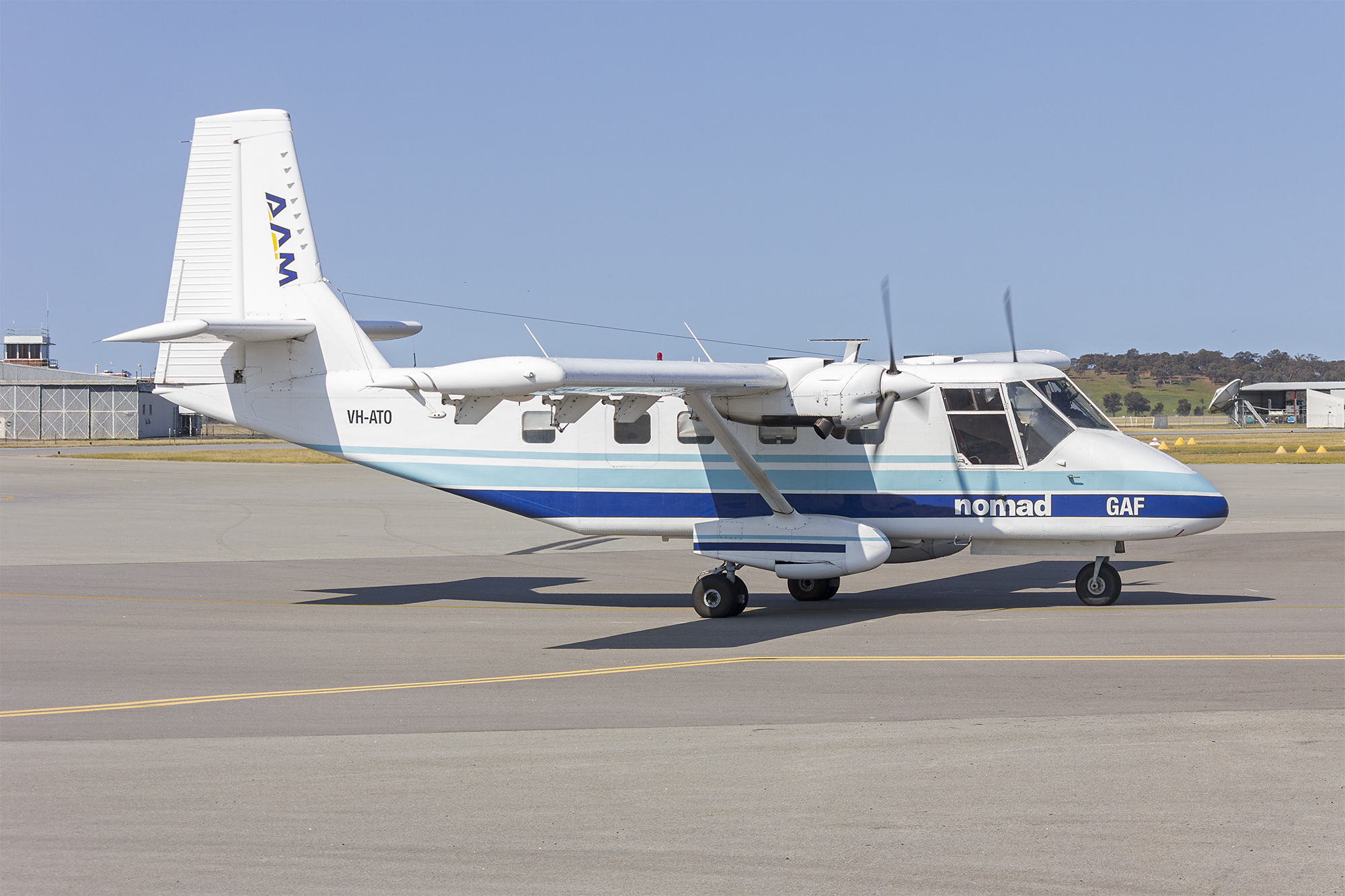
The last airworthy Nomad in Australia, an N22C in 2017

During 1985, production of the Nomad was terminated; in total, only 172 aircraft (including the two prototypes) were manufactured, largely due to the limited number of foreign sales that had been secured by GAF. In 1986, GAF was incorporated into Aerospace Technologies of Australia, which has since been rebranded as Boeing Australia.

In June 2008, Gippsland Aeronautics (now Mahindra Aerospace) announced it had won bidding to take over the Nomad's type certificate; the company also stated that it would probably be restarting production of new aircraft at some point. Prior to this acquisition, some of the GippsAero design and testing engineers, including the company's co-founder George Morgan, had worked for GAF during the Nomad's development. Reportedly, the N24-based GA18 was to be re-engineered with new powerplants and propellers, a glass cockpit, and would incorporate various weight-saving measures. It was planned to bring it into service after the development and certification of the new ten-seat GA10, which was due to be completed in March 2013. By 2021, GippsAero had ceased all production and development and plans for the GA18 had been abandoned.

As of December 2009, only one Nomad was still flying in Australia, although another four were operating in neighbouring New Zealand.

== Design ==
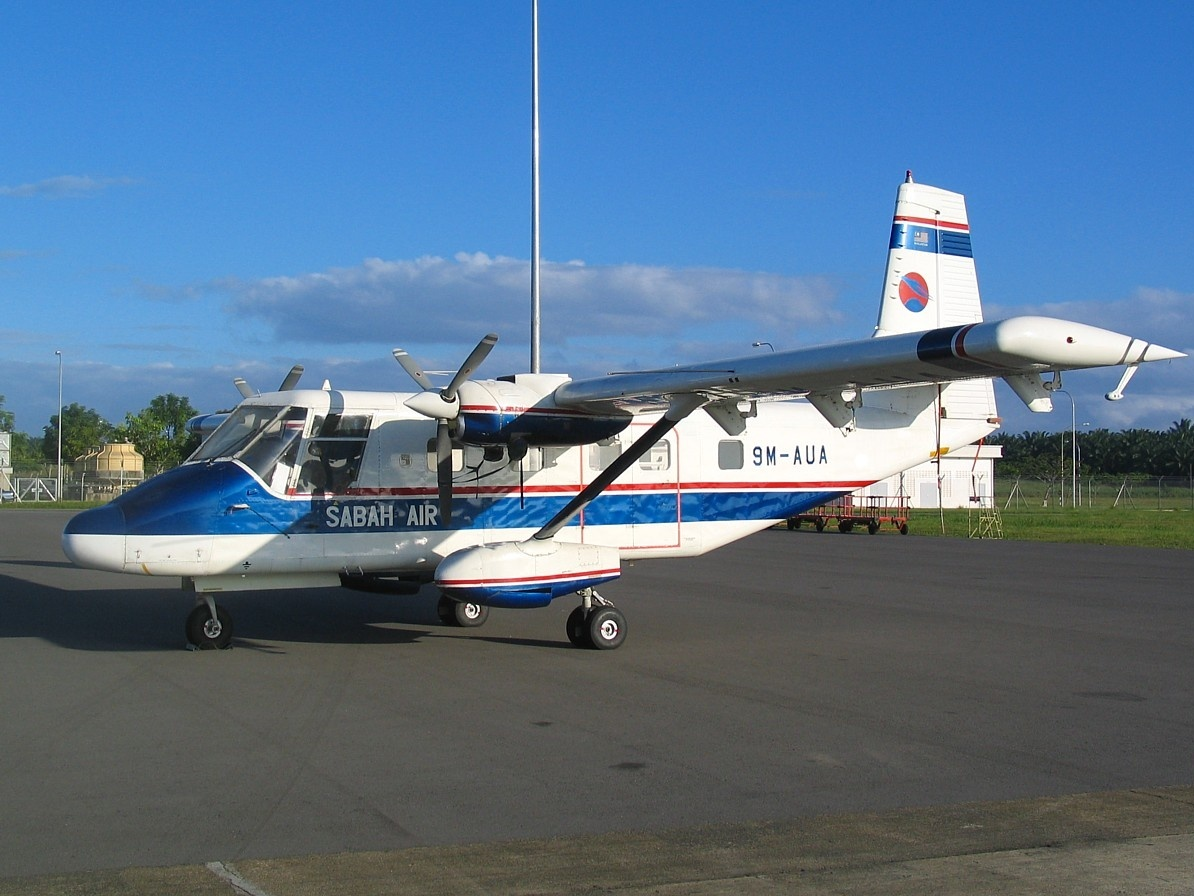
The N22B is 41 ft 3 in (12.57 m) long with 5 side windows

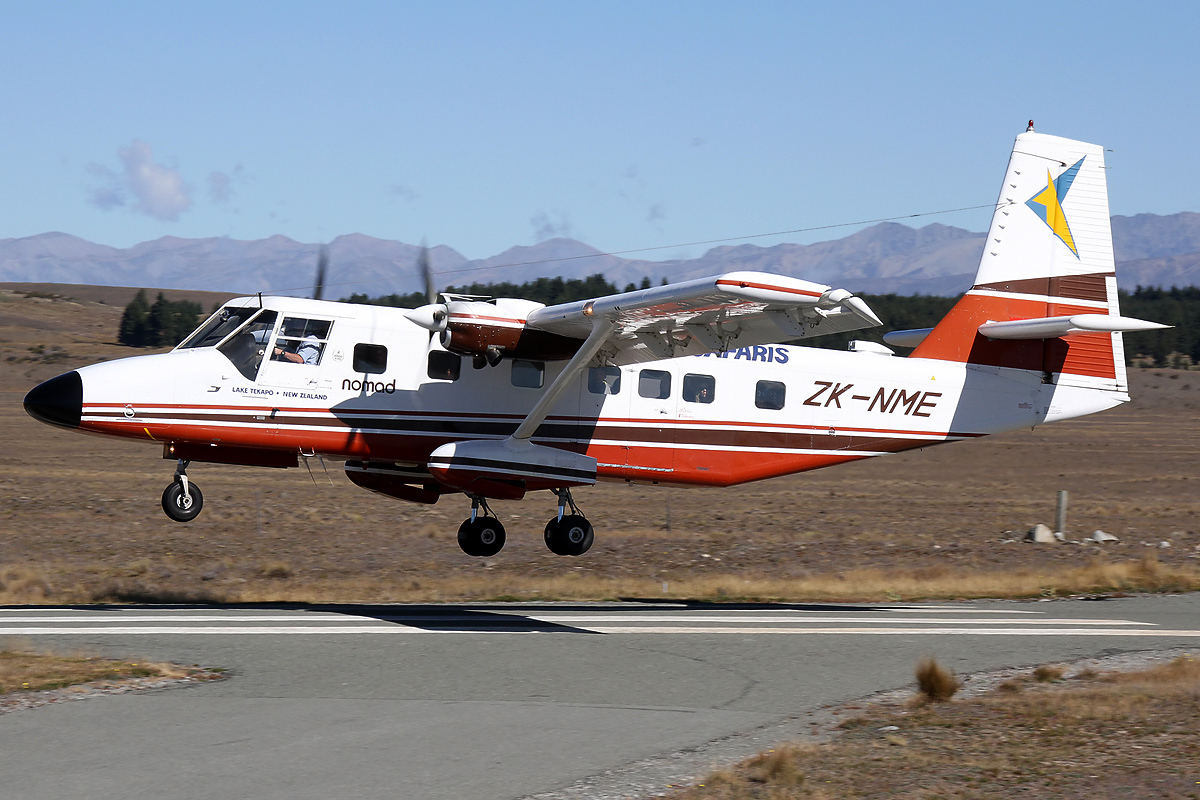
The N24 has 7 side windows and is 5 ft 10 in (1.77 m) longer than the N22B

The GAF Nomad is a twin-engine utility/commuter aircraft capable of Short Takeoff/Landing (STOL) operations. It was produced in two primary variants, the N22B and N24A, the latter being 5 ft 10 in (177 cm) longer than the N22B; the N24A also differed by its larger nose compartment and separated access provided for the main baggage compartment, which was located aft of the cabin. Key features of the Nomad's general configuration included its rugged and straightforward design, STOL performance, its compact and economic engines and its relatively unobstructed and flat cabin floor. It had been designed to meet or exceed established military requirements of the era, as well as in compliance with regulations set out in the Federal Aviation Administration's (FAA) FAR Part 23.

The Nomad was powered by a pair of Allison 250B17B/C turboprop engines, capable of generating up to 400 hp (300 kW) each. Journalist Hugh Field observed the selection of this powerplant to be atypical, while its basic model had a strong reputation from its widespread use on helicopters, the Nomad was the first application of this engine model. GAF's design team, although reportedly having been initially hesitant about applying a new engine to a new airframe, praised the engine's behaviour upon the prototypes. In-flight, core engine operations could be controlled via a single lever, although additional controls are used for atypical actions such as feathering. For ease of maintenance, the nacelles were built for easy access, while the engines consist of sub-assemblies that can be individually overhauled or replaced without extracting the entire engine.

The cabin of the Nomad has a continuous rectangular cross-section and a large freight door, both features favourable towards utility/freight operators. It has a full-width flat floor, complete with tie-down rails, which has been stressed to bear at least 150 lb/sq ft (730 kg/m^{2}). While most commonly used as a baggage hold, the nose compartment could also be configured into a bay for housing various equipment packages, including radar systems, cameras, or laser scanning/ranging equipment. Externally, the flat underside of the fuselage could be furnished with a pair of hard points, suitable for the installation of mini-guns and other munitions; an additional four hard points can be fitted under the wings. To achieve an unobstructed fuselage, the two spars of the strut-braced wing are not continuous, terminating at attachment points on the side of the fuselage.

According to Flight International, the adoption of a retractable undercarriage was a relatively unusual feature for an aircraft of this type; GAF designers selected this arrangement as to avoid excessive aerodynamic drag while enabling the use of large, widely spaced low-pressure tyres, these being key to allowing for rough field operations. Another uncommon feature for an aircraft of its class was the adoption of an all-moving tailplane. GAF suggested that a swing-tail variant could be easily produced due to an intentionally-designed manufacturing joint in the rear-fuselage that could act as a break point. The Nomad was made available in an amphibian variant; it was reportedly one of only a few aircraft in production to feature this facility during the 1980s. The Nomad also possesses a greater maximum cruise speed than most other strut-braced competitors, save for the de Havilland Canada DHC-6 Twin Otter.

The Nomad's cockpit, while typically fitted with dual flight controls, is designed to be operated by a single pilot. All of the primary controls are either duplicated or of a fail-safe design; both the flaps and undercarriage are electrically actuated; to aid low-speed manoeuvring, an auto-flap button immediately selects 20° flap. For militarised models, the cockpit can be outfitted with Stanley Aviation zero-zero ejection seats, boron-carbide armour protection around the seats, forward bulkhead and side-panels, as well as bullet-resistant glass installed in the panels of windscreen. The cockpit reportedly possesses above-average external visibility in most directions.

== Operational history ==
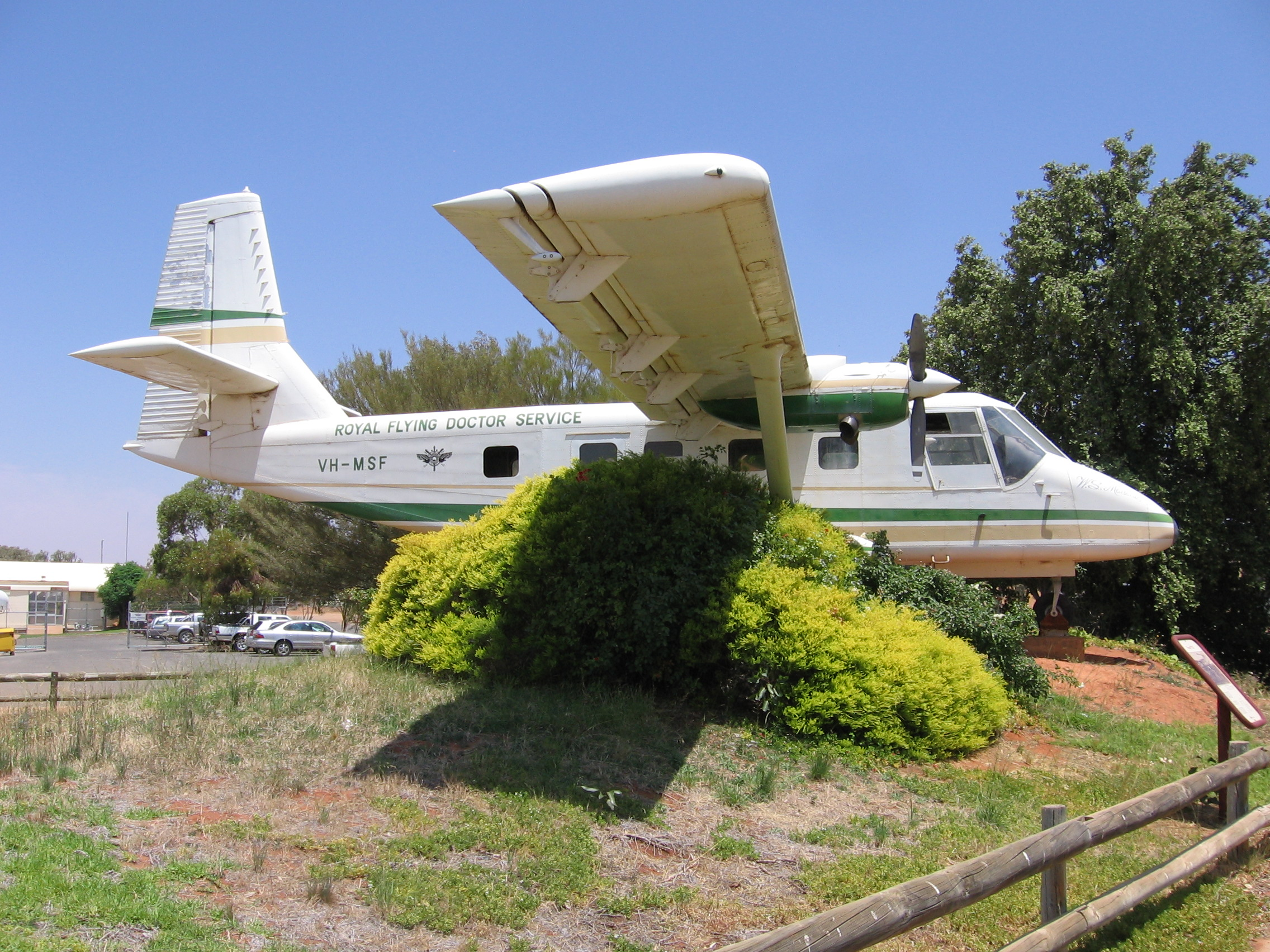
Nomad N22C displayed at the Royal Flying Doctor Service base, Broken Hill Airport

=== Civil use ===
According to aviation publication Flight International, the principal civil markets for the Nomad were the Pacific and North American regions. The stretched 16-seat N24A version was the main commercial variant and the most successful model of the Nomad in the United States. In the US market, the type was marketed and sold by the Hughes Aircraft Company which acted as a distributor; by early 1981, Hughes had taken delivery of 20 Nomads, around half of those in commercial use at that point.

=== Military use ===
==== Australia ====
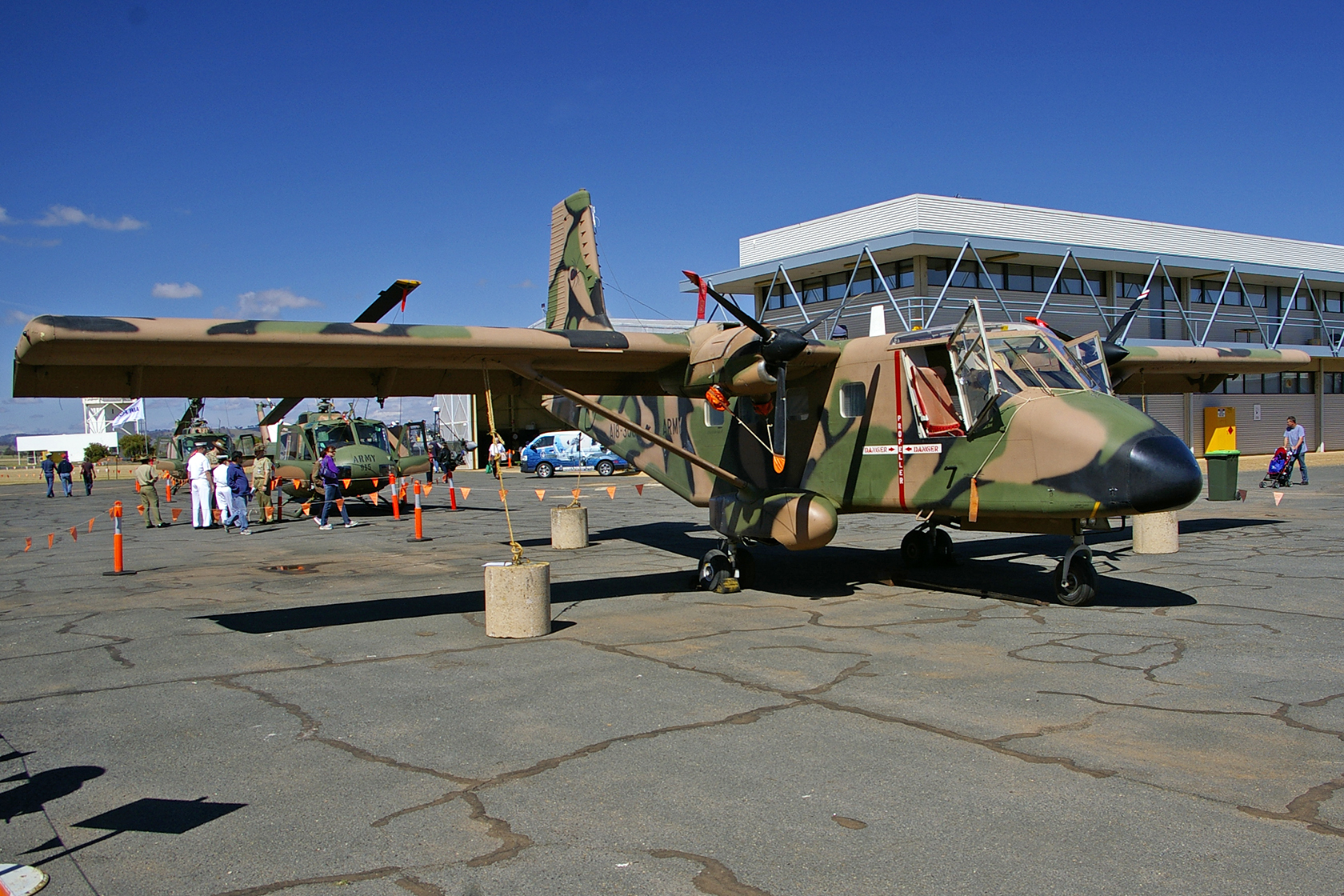
Australian Army N22B displayed at RAAF Base Wagga

The Australian Army leased the second prototype N22 in 1973. It acquired 11 N22B between 1975 and 1977 for the 173rd Aviation Squadron. In 1987 it acquired a 12th N22B from the Royal Australian Air Force. In 1993 the Army acquired eight more N22B and four N24A to replace its Pilatus PC-6 Porters. These 12 aircraft had been stored unsold when production ceased. All were withdrawn in 1995 following a report issued in May of that year which recommended the type's withdrawal from military duties amid concerns over airworthiness. Most were sold to the Indonesian Navy, but two unflyable airframes were retained as training aids.

The Royal Australian Air Force (RAAF) acquired an N22B in 1977. Although owned by the RAAF, it was operated as part of the Army's 173rd Aviation Squadron and was eventually transferred to the Army in 1987. In 1989 the RAAF acquired a former Coastwatch Nomad Searchmaster and three N24As; one had been a GAF/ASTA test frame and two were from a cancelled order for United States Customs Service. According to journalist Ian McPhedran, the Nomad became unpopular with military pilots due to safety concerns that were not addressed by GAF. In 1993 the RAAF decided to withdraw most of its Nomads; several of the retired aircraft were sold to Indonesia. This sale was not without controversy, as it allegedly cost more to sell the aircraft than to scrap them.

==== Indonesia ====
The Indonesian Navy Aviation Service was an early customer for the type and would eventually operate a relatively large fleet. Between 1975 and 1977, it received its first batch of 12 Nomad Searchmaster B and six Searchmaster L aircraft. These 12 surveillance planes were offered by Australia to Indonesia during the early months of the invasion of East Timor, at a moment military operations against the East Timorese resistance were particularly intense and murderous. Subsequently, Indonesia acquired a pair of N24As from the RAAF during 1993, quickly followed by 14 N22B and four N24A from the Australian Army in 1995; these were largely operated for aerial surveillance purposes. The 1990s purchases came at a cost of $2 million to Indonesia, but were supported by around $1 million per year of funding from Australia for the following decade. During 2011, it was announced that just over half of the Indonesian fleet was to be placed into storage and that only a handful of aircraft were to continue regular flight operations after this point.

== Variants ==
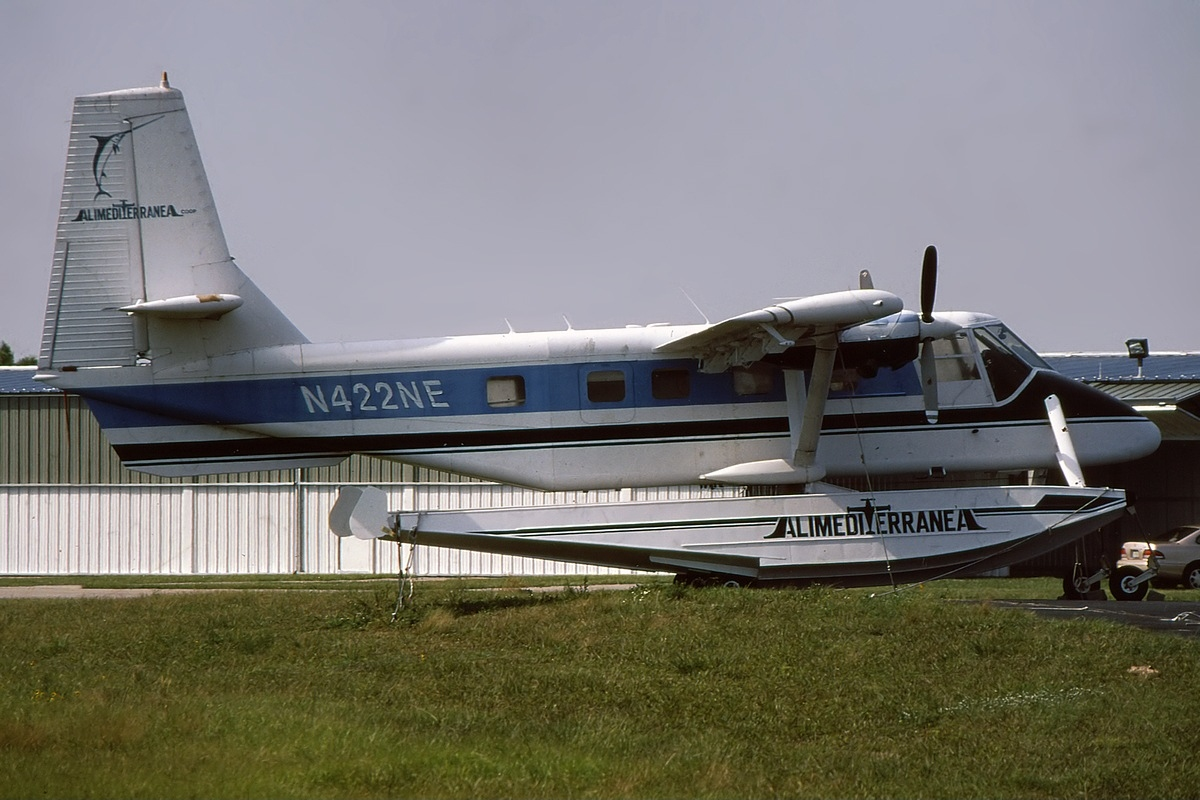
Alimediterranea N22 on floats

N.2 Nomad
Prototype, two built.
N.22
Initial production version for 12 passengers for the Australian Army.
N.22B
13 passenger civil version.
N.22C
Cargo variant modified from N.22B with Maximum Takeoff Weight increased to 4,050 kilograms (8,930 lb).
N.22F Floatmaster
Floatplane version with Wipline floats.
N.24
Utility transport aircraft with a fuselage lengthened by 1.14 m (3.7 ft).
N.24A
Improved version for 17 passengers, 40 built.
N.24B
GA18
Re-engineered 18-seat N24 in development by GippsAero.

Nomad Missionmaster
Military transport and utility aircraft.
Nomad Searchmaster
Maritime patrol and surveillance aircraft.
Nomad N.22 Searchmaster B
Coastal patrol aircraft, seven built.
Nomad N.22 Searchmaster L
Improved version of the Searchmaster B, 11 built.
Nomad N.22 Searchmaster LI
Improved version of the Searchmaster B, fitted with the APS-104(N) 2 radar.
Nomad N.22 Searchmaster LII
Improved version of the Searchmaster B, fitted with the APS-104(V) 5 radar.
B.L.9
(Thai: บ.ล.๙) Royal Thai Armed Forces designation for the N.22B.
B.JL.9
(Thai: บ.จล.๙) Royal Thai Armed Forces designation for an attack version of the N.22B.
B.TL.9
(Thai: บ.ตล.๙) Royal Thai Armed Forces designation for an observation/reconnaissance version of the N.22B.
B.TK.2
(Thai: บ.ธก.๒) Royal Thai Armed Forces designation for the N.24A.

== Operators ==
=== Civil operators ===
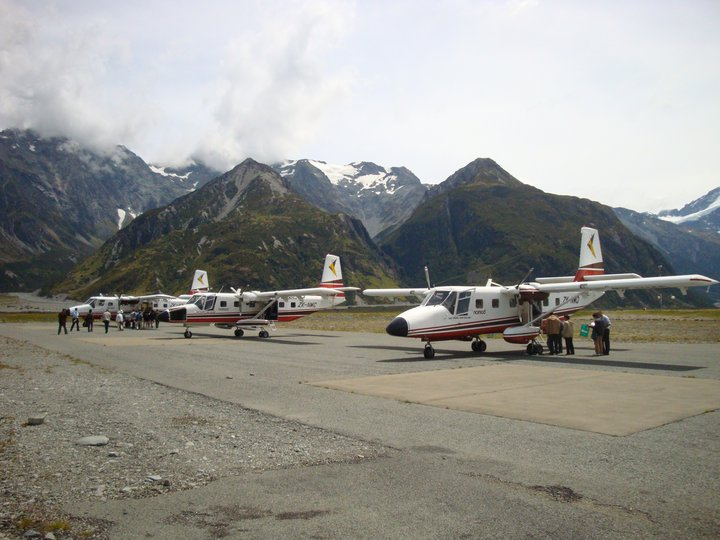
Three Air Safaris N24s

This list includes former Nomad operators.

Australia

- Air Queensland (Previously Bush Pilots Airways)
- Barrier Reef Airways (Float plane version)
- Clubair
- National Safety Council of Australia
- Royal Flying Doctor Service
- Skywest Airlines
- Sunstate Airlines

Chile

- Transportes Aéreos Isla Robinson Crusoe

Italy

- Alimediterranea

Malaysia

- Layang Layang Aerospace
- Sabah Air

Netherlands

- Holland Aero Lines

New Zealand

- Air Safaris
- Great Barrier Airlines

Papua New Guinea

- Independent Air Transport
- Douglas Airways [Formerly Aerial Tours (PNG)]

Paraguay

- Paraguay Air Service

Samoa

- Polynesian Airlines

Suriname

- Gum Air

Switzerland

- Rhine Air

United States

- Air Marshall Islands
- Air New Orleans
- Century Airlines (commuter air carrier in California)
- Coral Air
- Princeton Airways
- Skybus Express Airlines
- Southeastern Commuter Airlines

=== Military operators ===
==== Current ====
Philippines

- Philippine Air Force – 3 Active in 2024 out of 20 Nomads delivered.

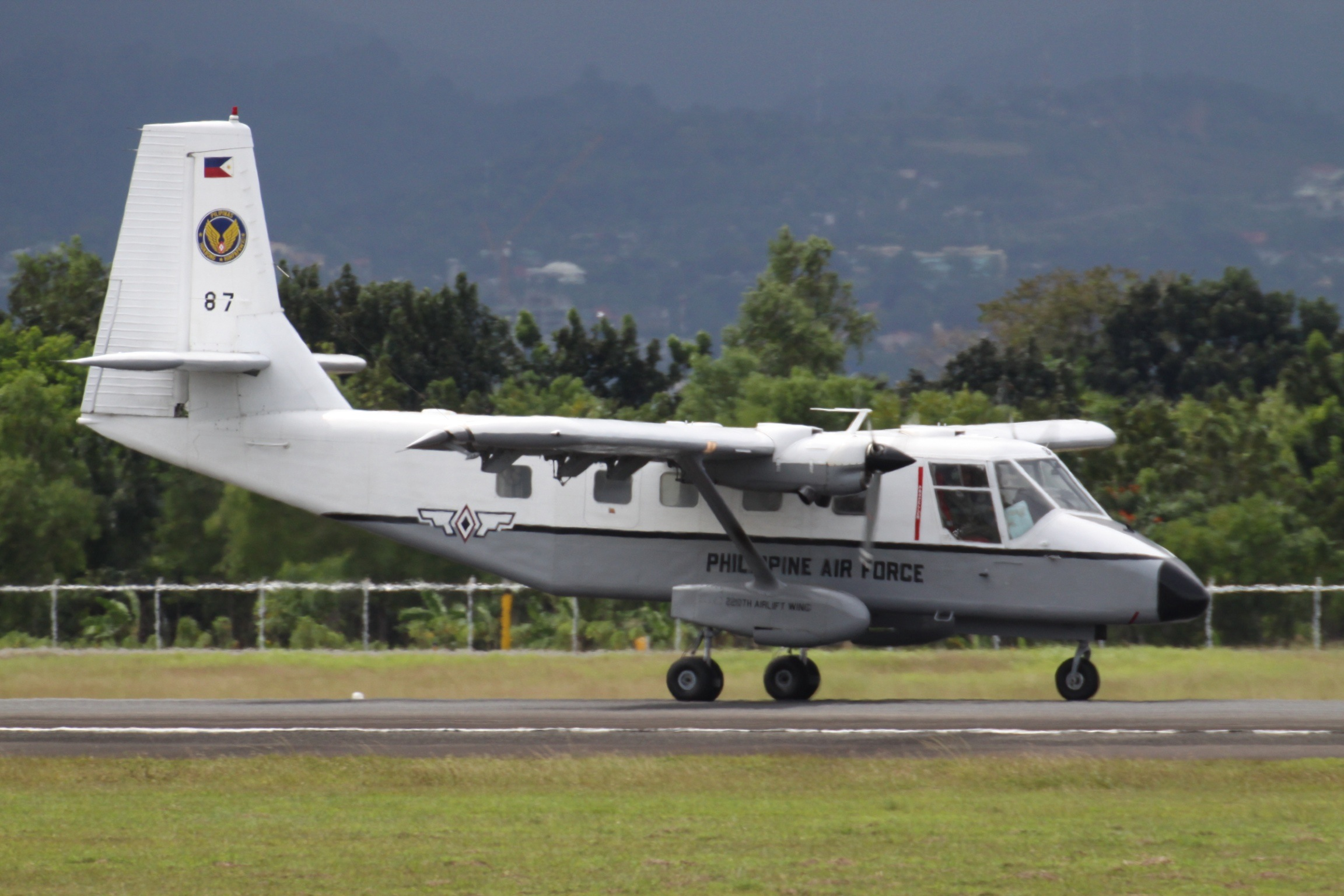
Philippine Air Force N22SL at Mactan–Cebu International Airport

==== Former ====
Australia

- Australian Army Aviation – former operator.
  - 173rd Aviation Squadron – one N22 (prototype, leased), 20 N22B, four N24A
  - School of Army Aviation (two N22B seconded from 173rd Aviation Squadron specifically to train Papua New Guinea Defence Force student pilots)
- Royal Australian Air Force – one N22B, one Nomad Searchmaster, three N24A, former operator.
  - No. 75 Squadron RAAF
  - Aircraft Research and Development Unit

Indonesia

- Indonesian Navy – 42 N22B and N24A Nomad, former operator (currently replaced by C-212 and CN-235 )

Philippines

- Philippine Navy – 15 N24A Nomad, former operator.

Papua New Guinea

- Papua New Guinea Defence Force Air Operations Element – former operator of civilian variant N22B.

Thailand

- Royal Thai Air Force (N22B) 22 aircraft delivered from 1982, retired in December 2015
- Royal Thai Navy (N24A) – former operator.

=== Other government operators ===
Australia

- Australian Customs Service (Coastwatch)

United States

- United States Customs Service

== Aircraft on display ==
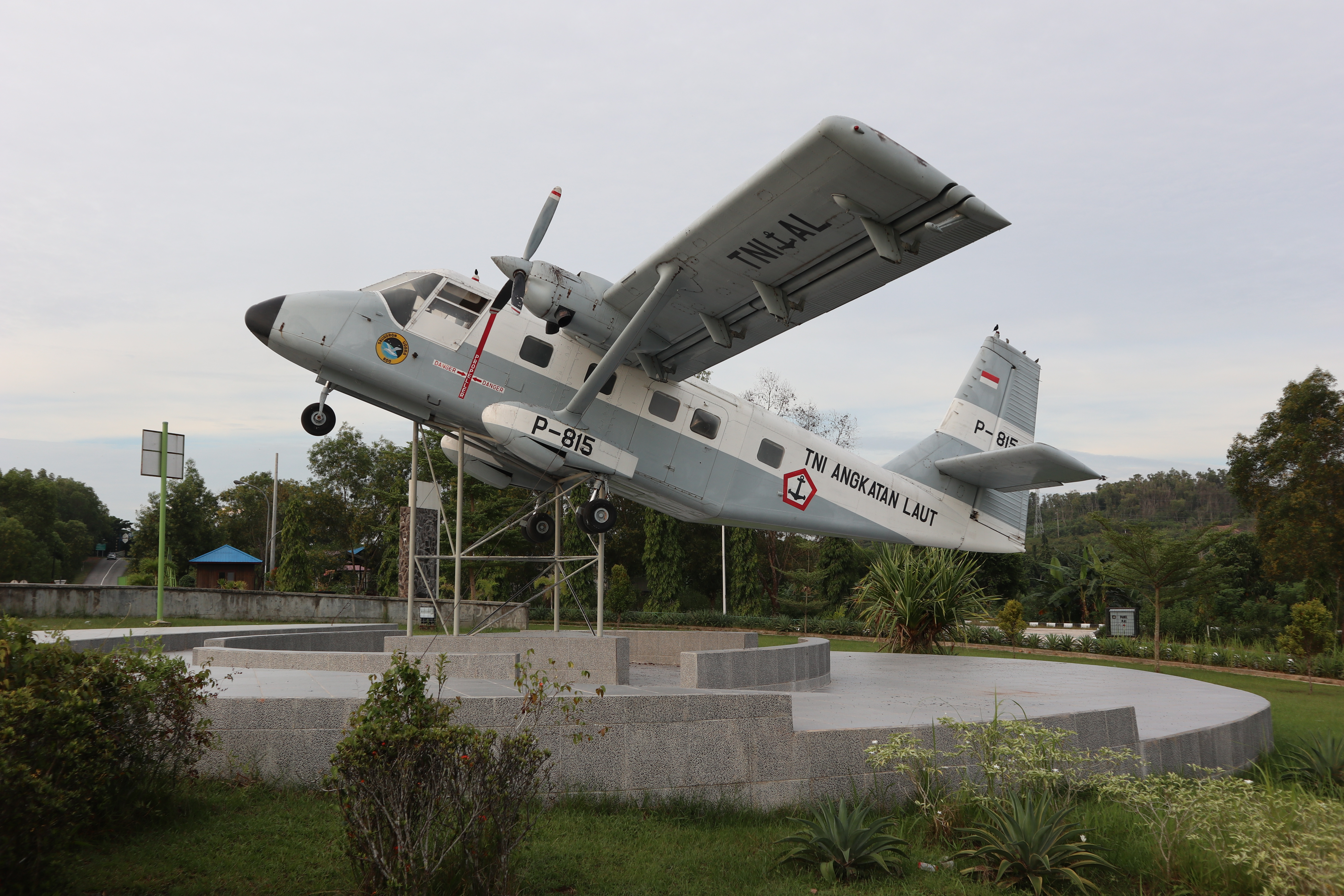
Indonesian Navy N22B displayed as a monument in Sangatta, East Kalimantan

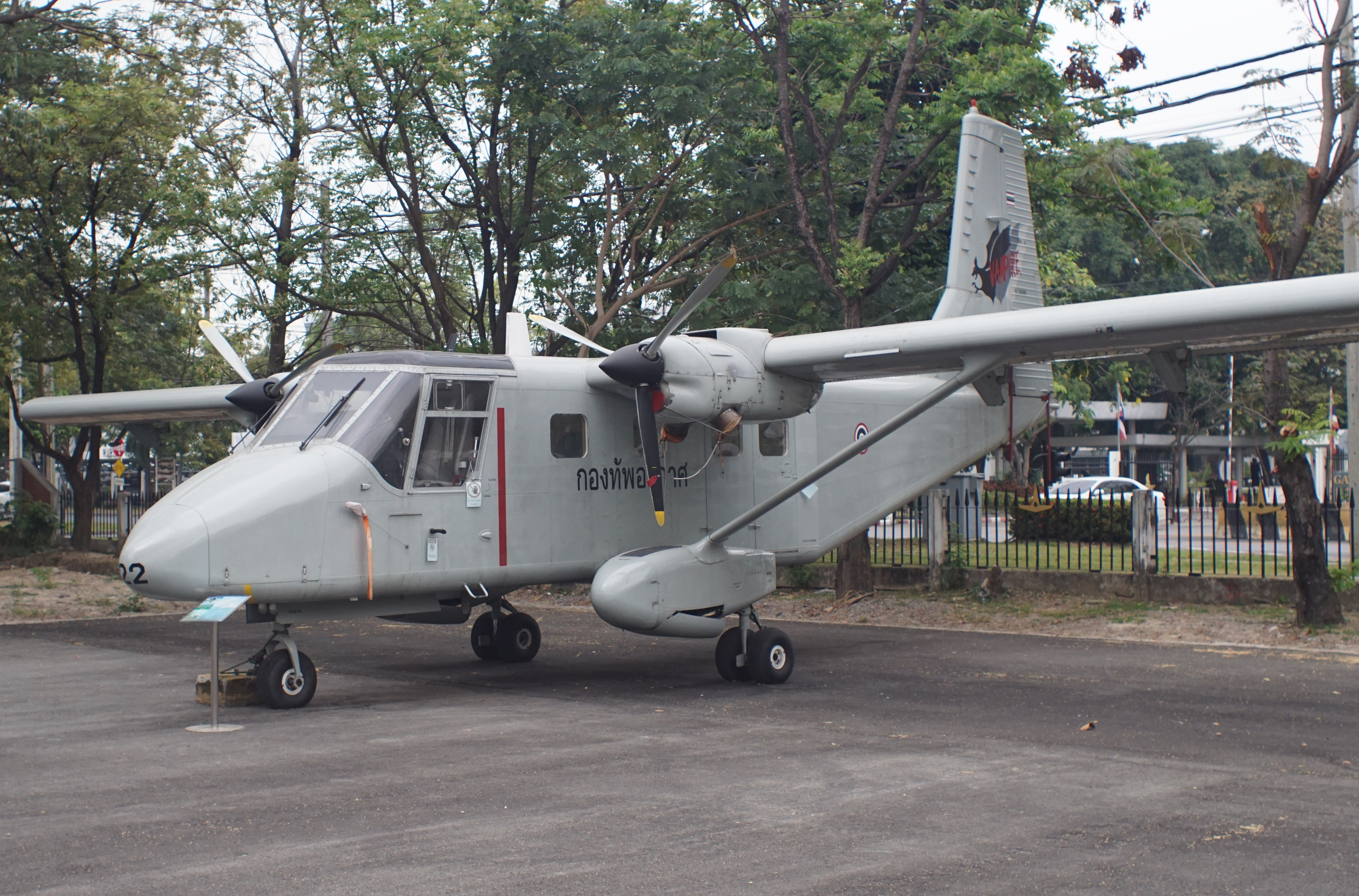
N22B displayed at the Royal Thai Air Force Museum

Australia

- N.22B - Flying Doctor Outback Heritage Centre, Broken Hill, NSW

Indonesia

- N.22B P-806 – Lamongan City Plaza, Lamongan Regency, East Java
- N.22B P-806 – Soesilo Soedarman Museum, Cilacap Regency, Central Java. Original number P-818
- N.22B P-807 – Politeknik Negeri Bandung, Bandung, West Java
- N.22B P-808 – Bahari Monument, Tegal, Central Java
- N.22B P-809 – SMK Penerbangan Dharma Wirawan, Sidoarjo Regency, East Java
- N.22B P-811 – Tirta Wisata Park, Jombang, Jombang Regency, East Java
- N.22B P-814 – Indonesian Naval Academy, Surabaya, East Java
- N.22B P-815 – Sangatta, East Kutai Regency, East Kalimantan
- N.22B P-823 – Juanda Naval Air Station, Sidoarjo Regency, East Java
- N.22B P-828 – Jl. Boulevard Kendari, Kendari, Southeast Sulawesi
- N.22B P-830 – Museum Probolinggo, Probolinggo, East Java
- N.24A P-838 – Tuban Town Park, Tuban, Tuban Regency, East Java
- N.24A P-839 – Terminal 2 Juanda International Airport, Sidoarjo Regency, East Java
- N.24A P-840 – Lake Wahyu, Plaosan, Magetan Regency, East Java
- N.24A P-843 – Asti Town Park, Caruban, Madiun Regency, East Java

Thailand

- N.22B 46122 – in the Royal Thai Air Force Museum at Don Mueang International Airport in Bangkok

Philippines

- N.22B 197422 – at the Mactan–Benito Ebuen Air Base at Mactan Cebu International Airport in Lapu Lapu City
- N22S-87 Ex VH-SDZ – in Southeast Asia Camouflage livery is an Outdoor Static Display at Tagaytay Library and Museum.

United States

- N.22C ex-N6328 of the United States Customs Service – on outdoor display at the Pima Air & Space Museum in Tucson, Arizona

== Notable incidents ==
- On 6 June 1976, Tun Fuad Stephens, the first chief minister of Sabah, Malaysia, plus ten others, died in the crash of a Nomad in the state capital, Kota Kinabalu.
- On 6 August 1976, a prototype model N24 operated by the aircraft manufacturer (GAF) crashed immediately after take-off from Avalon Airport for a flight to test a new modification of the horizontal stabiliser. The test pilot (Stuart Pearce, father of actor Guy Pearce) and chief structures designer (David Hooper) were killed, and the flight test engineer was seriously injured.
- On 23 December 1979, a Nomad operated by Douglas Airways (P2-DNL) crashed on the airstrip (MRM) at Manari, a village on the Kokoda Track in the Central Province of Papua New Guinea, killing all 16 passengers and crew.
- On 4 May 1987, a Nomad of the Indonesian Naval Aviation Unit, PUSPENERBAL crashed at the Mapur Island, Bintan area, Riau Province. The aircraft was a total loss.
- On 12 Mar 1990, a Nomad (A18-401) of the Royal Australian Air Force (RAAF) crashed following an in-flight failure of the horizontal stabiliser, killing the test pilot who was the sole occupant. The aircraft had previously done 177 hours of single-engine ground running in tests performed by the aircraft manufacturer.
- On 9 September 1991, an Australian Army N22B Nomad crashed near Drake in northern NSW with the loss of four people, including the pilot.
- On 18 September 1998, two US Customs N22S Nomads collided over the sea between Puerto Rico and Curaçao. Both damaged planes attempted to return to Puerto Rico, however, one plane crashed into the sea one mile east of Mona Island. The pilot was killed while the copilot was rescued. The second plane was able to land safely in Aquadilla. Puerto Rico.
- On 2 July, 2000, a Philippine Air Force GAF Nomad experienced possible engine trouble after takeoff from Cagayancillo Airport on Cagayancillo off Palawan in the Philippines. Its pilot attempted to return to the airport, but the plane overshot the runway and crashed into the Sulu Sea, killing 11 of the 12 people on board. Philippine governor Salvatore Socrates and Philippine Air Force Major General Santiago Madrid were among the dead.
- On 10 February 2001, Gum Air’s N24A Nomad (PZ-TBP) crashed on a flight from Paramaribo – Zanderij (Johan Adolf Pengel International Airport PBM/SMJP) to Njoeng Jacob Kondre Airstrip SMJK. The aircraft had fallen out of radio contact, and personnel at the airstrip in Jacob Kondre said it was flying low, and crashed into a mountain. All nine passengers plus the pilot perished.
- On 30 December 2007, a PENERBAL Nomad crashed in the area of We island, Nangroe Aceh Darussalam Province.
- On 7 September 2009, a Nomad of the Indonesian Naval Aviation Unit, PENERBAL, crashed in the area of Bulungan, East Borneo. The aircraft was on a routine patrol near Ambalat Oil Block. The accident caused the fatality of one Naval officer, plus three civilians on board. The pilot and copilot received serious injuries.
- On 28 January 2010, a Nomad of the Philippine Air Force (PAF) crashed shortly after takeoff into a residential area in Cotabato City, killing Maj. Gen. Butch Lacson, commander of the PAF 3rd Air Division, plus seven other officers on board.

== Specifications ==
GAF Brochure
Variant	N22B	N24A
Passengers	12	16
Height	18 ft 2 in / 5.52m	
Span	54 ft 2 in / 16.46 m	
Wing area	324 sq.ft / 30.1 m^{2}, 9:1 AR, modified NACA 23018 airfoil	
Length	41 ft 3 in / 12.57 m	47 ft 1 in / 14.34 m
Cabin length	17 ft 7 in / 5.34 m	21 ft 4 in / 6.50 m
Cab. Height * Width	5 ft 2 in * 4 ft 3 in / 1.57 m * 1.28 m	
Cab. volume	360 cu.ft / 10.2 m³	410 cu.ft / 11.6 m³
Baggage	58 cu.ft / 1.64 m³	70 cu.ft / 1.99 m³
MTOW	8,500 lb (3,856 kg)	9,400 lb (4,264 kg)
Usable fuel	268 US gal (1,010 L; 223 imp gal)	
Empty weight	4,730 lb / 2,150 kg	5,241 lb / 2,377 kg
cruise	193 mph / 168 kn / 311 km/h	
Minimum control speed	66 kn (76 mph; 122 km/h)	66.5 kn (76.5 mph; 123.2 km/h)
range	840 mi / 730 nmi / 1352 km, endurance 8 h at 161 mph / 140 kn / 259 km/h, FL50	
climb rate	1,460 ft/min / 7.4 m/s	
Ceiling	25,000 ft (7,600 m)	
2* Turboprop	Allison 250B17B/C	
2* Power	400–420 hp (300–310 kW)	
2* Propeller	Hartzell 3-blade, 90.63 in (2,302 mm) diam.	
Takeoff to 50 ft	1,050 ft / 320 m	
Landing from 50 ft	740 ft / 226 m	

== See also ==
Aircraft of comparable role, configuration, and era

- Britten-Norman BN-2 Islander (10 seats, twin turboprop variant)
- Britten-Norman Trislander (18 seats trimotor)
- De Havilland Canada DHC-6 Twin Otter (21 seats, twin turboprop)
- Dornier 228 (20 seats, twin turboprop)
- Mitsubishi MU-2 (12 seats, twin turboprop)
- Short SC.7 Skyvan (21 seats, twin turboprop)
