= Mahindra Aerospace =

Aerospace division of the Indian multinational conglomerate company Mahindra Group

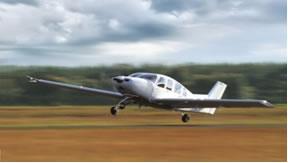
- Type: Private
- Industry: Aerospace
- Founded: 2003; 23 years ago
- Founder: Anand Mahindra
- Headquarters: Mumbai, Maharashtra, India
- Key people: Mr. Arvind Mehra (Executive Director & CEO); Anand Mahindra (Vice-Chairman & MD); Hemant Luthra (President)
- Products: Aircraft; Aviation; Aerostructures
- Parent: Mahindra Group
- Website: www.mahindraaerospace.com

Mahindra Aerospace is an Indian aerospace company and a part of the Mahindra Group. It is the first Indian private firm to make smaller civil aircraft for the Indian general aviation market. It is an AS9100 Rev.D certified design organization.

== Acquisitions ==
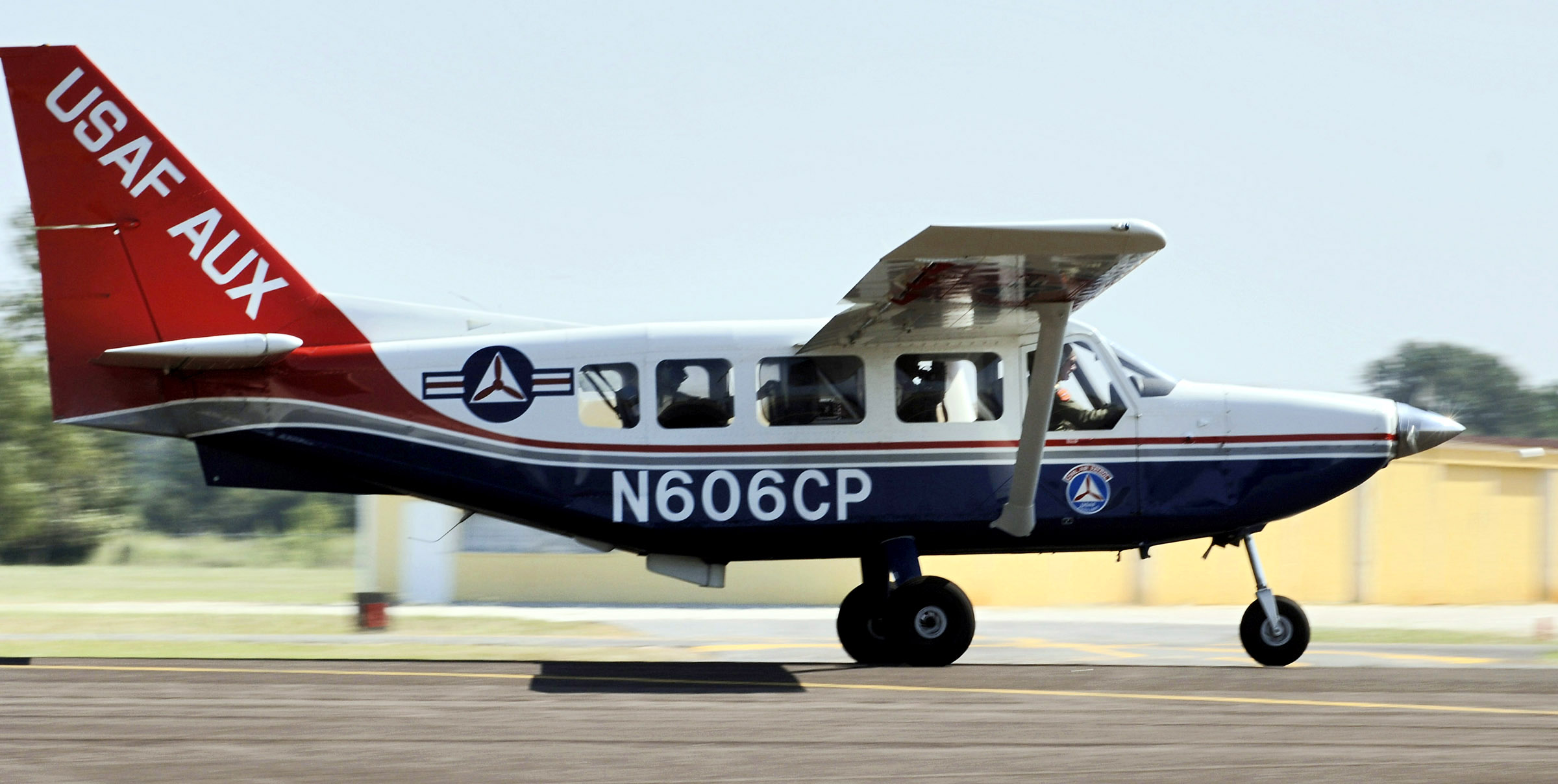
A Civil Air Patrol GA8 Airvan on takeoff from West Houston Airport during a mission following Hurricane Rita in 2005.

The parent Mahindra & Mahindra group acquired a 75.1% majority stake in Australian aircraft manufacturer Gippsland Aeronautics in December 2009, builder of the Gippsland GA200, Gippsland GA8 Airvan, and the Gippsland GA10 Airvan. The company was renamed GippsAero. Also in December 2009 the Mahindra & Mahindra group also acquired a 75.1% stake in Aerostaff Australia, a component manufacturer of high-precision, close-tolerance, aircraft components and assemblies for large aerospace original equipment manufacturers. In June 2010 the company acquired the Australian Boeing unit, an aerospace component manufacturer.

== Products ==
National Aerospace Laboratories (NAL) and Mahindra Aerospace jointly developed the NAL NM5 light aircraft.

== Partnership with Airbus ==
During the Paris Air Show in 2015, the company signed a multi-million dollar aerospace deal with a Germany-based Airbus Group firm, Premium AEROTEC, for the manufacture and supply of metallic components. The contract spanned several years and included deliveries of over a million components per year. The facility at Narsapura near Bengaluru would be used.

On 9 April 2025, Airbus signed a contract with Mahindra Aerostructures Pvt. Ltd. (MAPL) through which the latter will produce the main fuselage assembly of the H130 helicopter in India. The first fuselage is scheduled to be delivered to Airbus Helicopters’ facilities in Europe in March 2027.

On 28 August, Airbus Helicopters signed a contract with Mahindra Aerostructures as part of which MAPL will supply the main fuselage of the H125 helicopter. The manufacturing is expected to begin immediately at MAPL's existing plant in Bengaluru with the first unit scheduled to be delivered in 2027.

On 31 August 2026, Mahindra Aerostructures received a contract from Airbus to manufacture and supply fuselage skins for Section 18 and 19, covering the rear fuselage and tail sections, of A320neo and A321XLR aircraft. The components will be produced near Bengaluru and supply them to the Airbus' Augsburg facility in Germany. The delivery would commence from 2028 onwards. Mahindra also plans to build larger fuselage structures in future. A roll forming contract from Airbus was also concluded recently.

== Air Force Medium Transport Aircraft ==
A memorandum of understanding (MoU) between Embraer Defense & Security, and Mahindra Group was signed in February 2024 with the intention of working together to offer C-390 Millenium aircraft to the Indian Air Force in its upcoming Medium Transport Aircraft procurement project. The businesses will investigate the possibility of making India a future C-390 regional hub. In collaboration with the Mahindra Group, Embraer suggested setting up an assembly line in September 2024.

On 17 October 2025, Embraer Defense & Security and Mahindra Group signed a strategic cooperation agreement to advance the C-390 Millennium aircraft for the IAF's MTA programme. Simultaneously, Embraer inaugurated its national office in Aerocity, New Delhi. In order to explore opportunities for local production, assembly, joint marketing, and MRO facilities, they will engage with the Indian aerospace ecosystem.

On 20 February 2026, Embraer and Mahindra Group announced their plans to advance location selection to establish an MRO base in India subject to IAF's selection of C-390 in the MTA programme. The facility will provide in-country maintenance and sustenance of the Indian C-390 fleet as well as a potential regional MRO hub.

== Manufacturing plants ==
- Narsapura Industrial Area, Kolar District, Karnataka, India

== See also ==
- Central Aircraft Manufacturing Company
- Hindustan Aeronautics Limited
- Tata Advanced Systems
