= GA200 =

GA200 may refer to:

- Gippsland Aeronautics GA200 - A light agricultural aircraft by Gippsland Aeronautics, Australia.
- Garuda Indonesia Flight 200 - Also referred to as GA200 or GIA200 (2007 Aviation Accident).
