= GA-8 =

GA-8 or GA 8 can refer to:

- GippsAero GA8 Airvan – 8-seat utility aircraft
- Georgia's 8th congressional district
- Georgia State Route 8
