= GA10 =

GA10, GA 10, or GA-10 may refer to:

== Georgia (U.S. state) ==
- Georgia's 10th congressional district, a congressional district in the U.S. state of Georgia
- Georgia State Route 10, a state highway in the central part of the state
  - U.S. Route 78 in Georgia

== Other uses ==
- GippsAero GA10, a utility aircraft
