= Latrobe Airport =

Latrobe Airport may refer to:

- Arnold Palmer Regional Airport in Latrobe, Pennsylvania, United States
- Latrobe Regional Airport in Morwell, Victoria, Australia
