= GippsAero =

Australian aircraft manufacturer

- Industry: Aerospace
- Founded: 1977
- Headquarters: Latrobe Regional Airport, Morwell, Victoria, Australia
- Key people: Peter Furlong; George Morgan
- Products: Aircraft
- Website: gippsaero.com.au

GippsAero (formerly Gippsland Aeronautics) is an Australian aircraft manufacturer based at Latrobe Regional Airport in Morwell, Victoria. The company builds single-engined utility aircraft, including the multi-role GA8 Airvan and the agricultural GA200 Fatman.

== History ==
Gippsland Aeronautics was founded in 1977 by Peter Furlong as an aircraft maintenance and modification business operating out of Latrobe Regional Airport in Morwell, working for large organisations such as the National Safety Council of Australia and Esso Australia, as well as local commercial operators. In 1984, George Morgan joined Peter Furlong to form Gippsland Aeronautics Pty Ltd as an incorporated entity.

Between 1985 and 1991, Gippsland Aeronautics developed the GA200 agricultural aircraft, following approaches by local aircraft operators to design an agricultural aircraft with better lifting and handling capabilities than other available aircraft. The GA200C Fatman was type certified by the Australian Civil Aviation Authority in 1991. In 1993, the company commenced design work on a new aircraft designated the GA8, to fill a market niche between the six-seater Cessna 206 and the ten-seater Cessna Caravan. The "proof of concept" GA8 Airvan made its first flight in March 1995 and appeared at the Australian International Airshow in Avalon. The prototype GA8 Airvan made its first flight in August 1996. The Airvan then underwent a major flight testing and development programme. In 2000, the Australian Civil Aviation Safety Authority certificated the GA8 Airvan to FAR 23 Amendment 48, and the vehicle began to be exported from December of the following year, with a delivery to Maya Island Air in Belize, Central America.

In 2002, the US Civil Air Patrol appointed Gippsland Aeronautics to supply Airvans, making the CAP the first American organisation to own and fly the Airvan, and the largest fleet owner of the Australian GA8 worldwide. In 2003, the Airvan gained Type Certification in Canada with Avalon Aircraft Corporation of Richmond, British Columbia appointed as the Canadian representative. This was followed by type certification by the US FAA. In 2004, the first Airvan was delivered to a Canadian operator, Wings Over Wilderness, and a Cargo Pod for Airvan was certified by the Australian Civil Aviation Authority.

The European Aviation Safety Agency (EASA) certified the GA8 Airvan in 2005. The Gippsland Aeronautics Airvan airframe #100 was rolled out in September of the following year. The completion of 100 Airvans was considered to be a significant milestone in Australian aircraft manufacturing. At least three other manufacturers of Australian civil aircraft have built more than 100 aircraft in the post-WW2 era, the others being the Transavia PL-12 Airtruk (118), the Victa Airtourer (168) and the Government Aircraft Factories (GAF) with 170 twin-engined N22 & N24 Nomads. By February 2007, Gippsland Aeronautics had built 110 GA8 Airvans and 50 GA200 Fatmans.

In December 2009, Mahindra Aerospace bought a 75.1% majority stake in the company.

In March 2011, at the 2011 Australian International Airshow, GippsAero announced the GA10. Development from the 8-seat GA8 Airvan piston-engined aircraft, the GA10 design has been stretched and re-engined with a turboprop engine to increase seating and payload capacity. In May 2012, the GA10 had its first flight. The GA10 ready for service date was originally forecast as March 2013, however this was subsequently delayed to 2014,.

In August 2020, GippsAero announced that it was halting production of the Airvan due to poor sales and would be restructuring to concentrate on providing support to existing operators of GippsAero aircraft. It was reported that Mahindra Aerospace had put GippsAero up for sale and would shut down the company unless a buyer could be found. Mahindra's 2021 Board Report indicated that GippsAero Pty Ltd had been converted into a spares and support organisation.

In November 2023, George Morgan announced that he had purchased GippsAero from Mahindra Aerospace and was now the company's sole owner.

On 26 October 2024, George Morgan and Peter Furlong were inducted into the Australian Aviation Hall of Fame for their contributions to Aviation in Australia and around the world.

In June 2025, production recommenced of complete aircraft manufacturing with the GA8 Airvan, making GippsAero the only manufacturer of commercial aircraft in Australia. New-build Airvans should be operational in 2026.

== Aircraft ==
=== GA200 Fatman ===
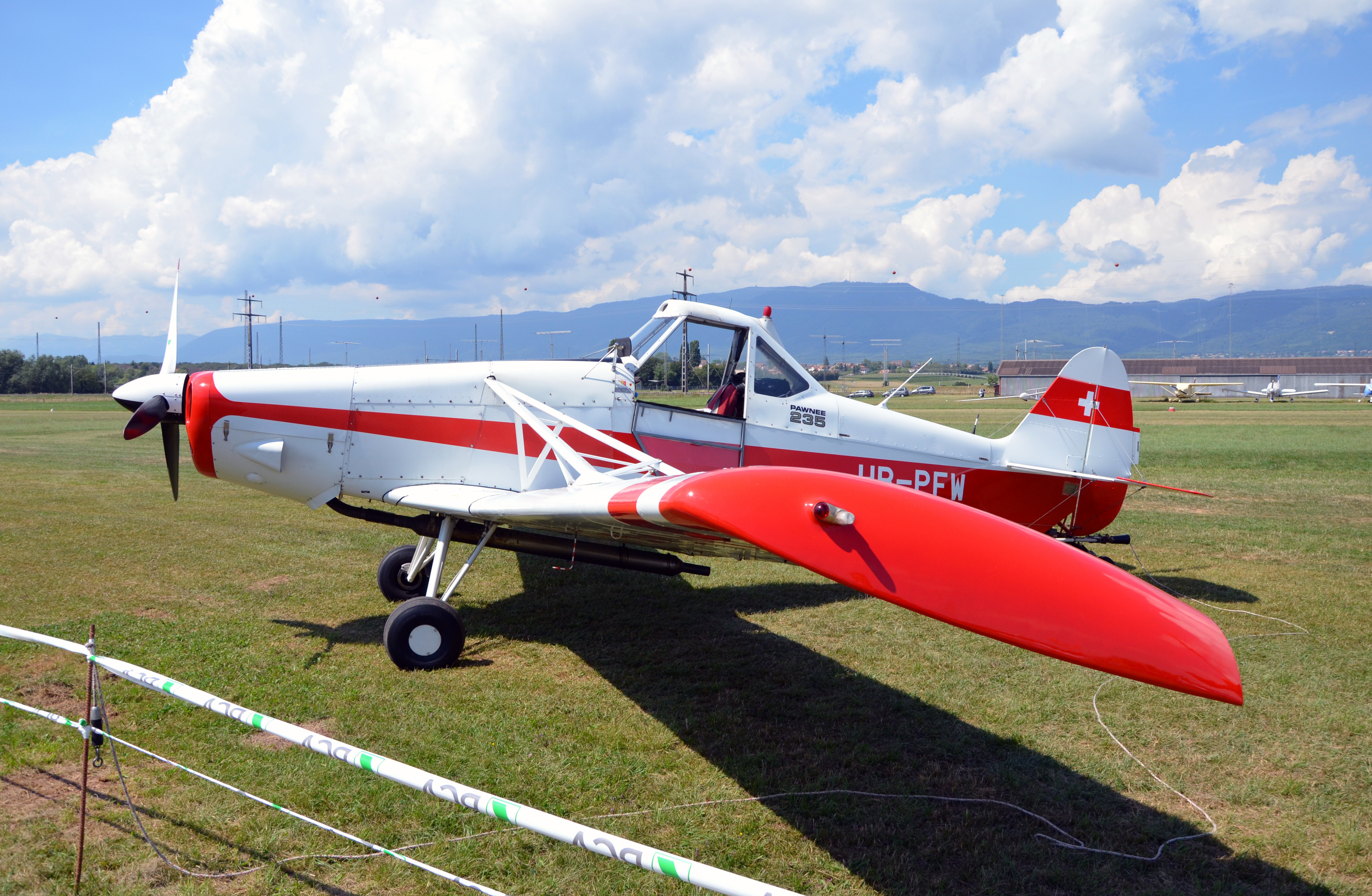
The Piper PA-25 Pawnee, on which the GA200 was based.

The modification of agricultural aircraft to improve capability and safety marked the beginnings of Gippsland Aeronautics' aircraft design and manufacturing business as it stands today. The company increasingly modified five agricultural Piper PA-25 Pawnees in the mid-1980s to the point where it was decided to certify a new design.

In 1991, Gippsland Aeronautics' first indigenous design, the GA200 Fatman, achieved Australian airworthiness certification. The certified production GA200 Fatman (also referred to unofficially as the GA200B) had a lifting capacity of 800 Litres with a 250 hp engine.

In 1993, the company certified a new model, the GA200C Fatman with the capability of lifting one tonne (1050 Litres) with a 300 hp engine, giving the aircraft a 30–50% better performance than any aircraft in its class. In the late 1990s, Fatman production was scaled down to make way for the Airvan.

=== GA8 Airvan ===
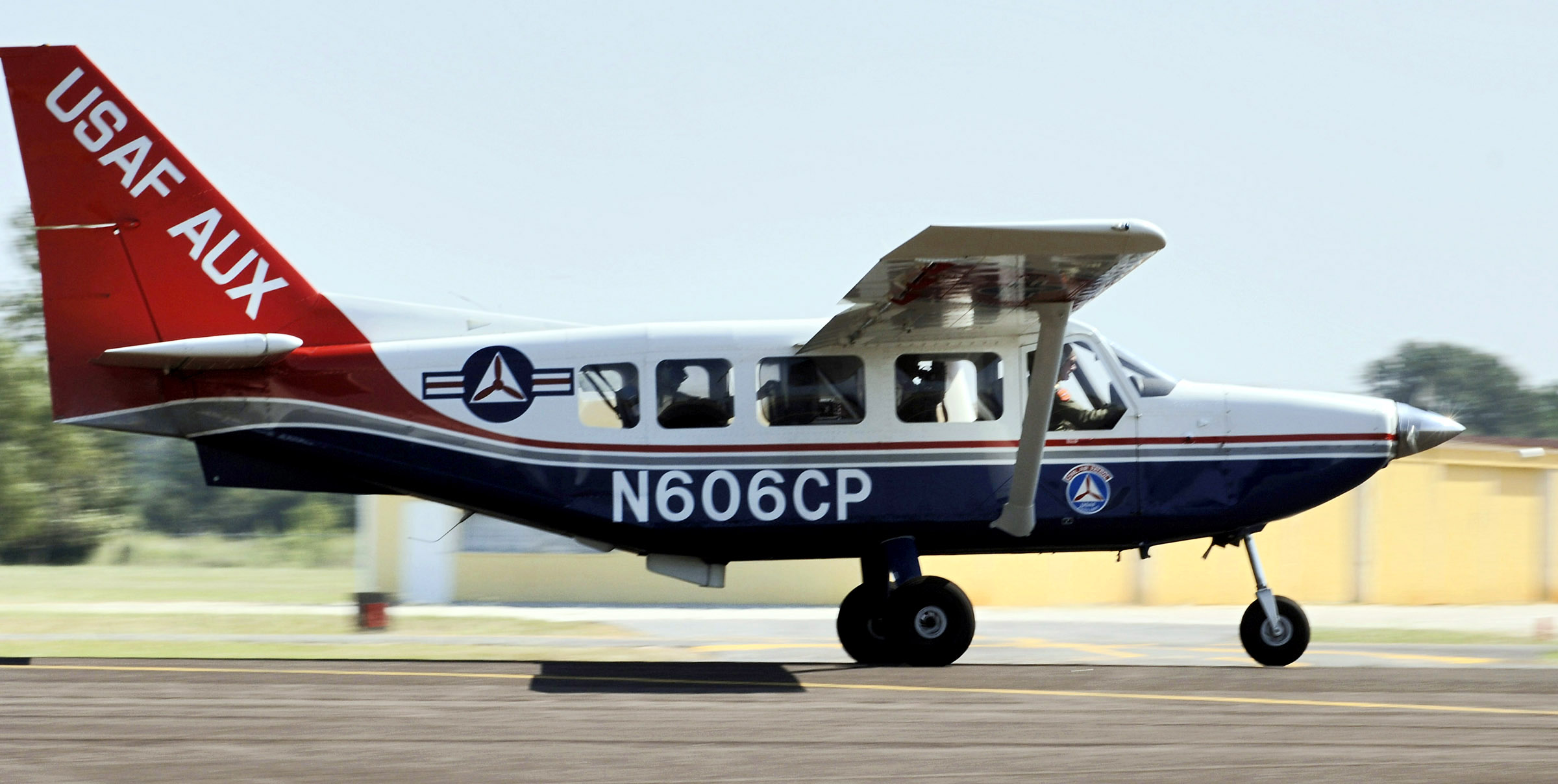
US Civil Air Patrol GA8 Airvan on takeoff from West Houston Airport during a mission following Hurricane Rita in 2005.

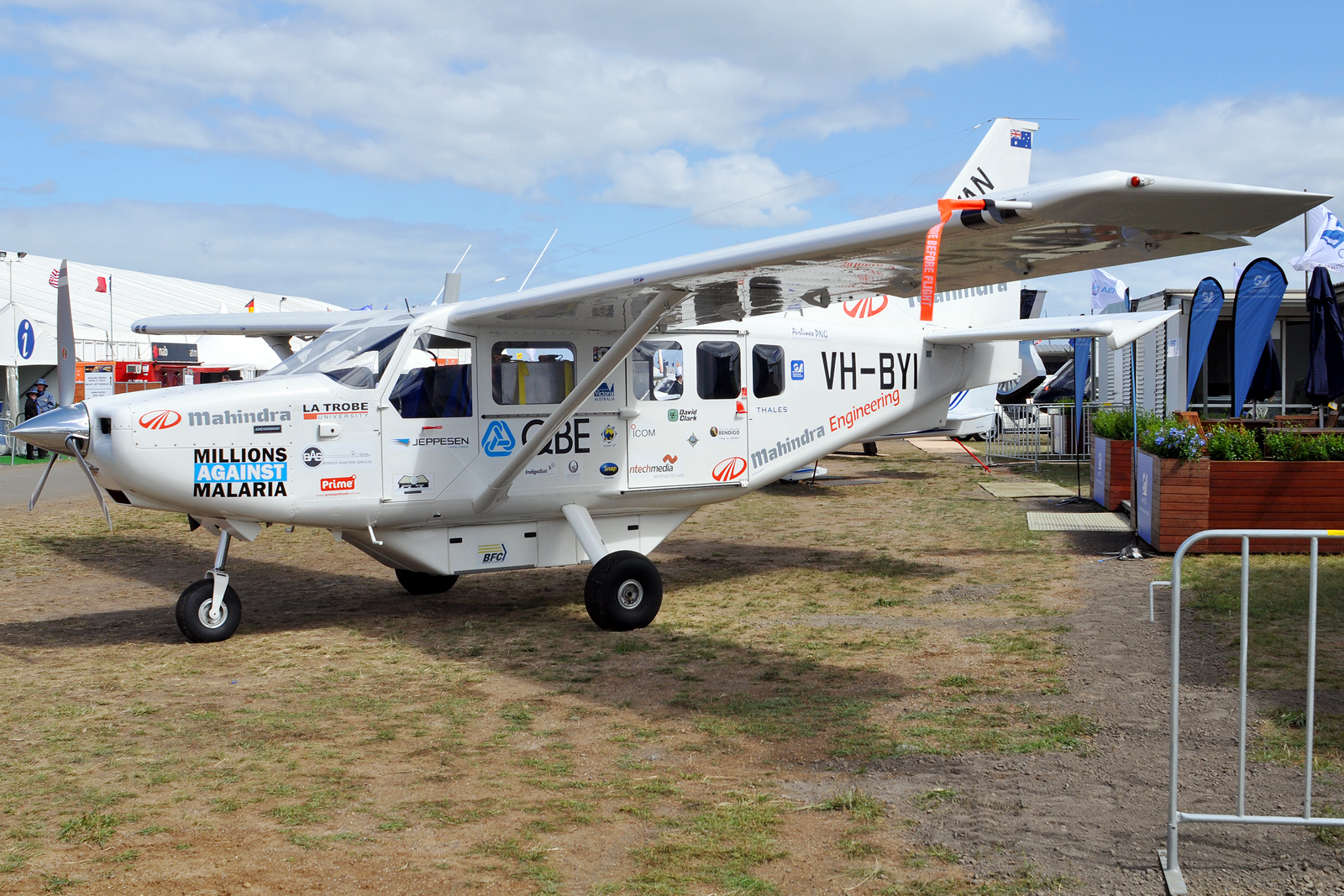
GA8 Airvan, registration VH-BYI

Despite the success of the Fatman variants, profitability was too dependent on the roller coaster cycles of the agricultural industry worldwide. Subsequently, Gippsland Aeronautics' second new design, the GA8 Airvan, was conceived by directors/designers Furlong and Morgan as a utility transport to replace the Cessna 206/207 and DHC Beaver. Recognising the Cessna 206 as "one of the world’s best workhorses", the pair saw the potential niche market for a piston-engine aircraft that could carry more passengers. This would improve the operators’ profitability without going to the expense of purchasing a turbine powered aircraft.

Thus the high wing, eight seat GA8 Airvan was born using the design of the GA200C as a basis. Certification commenced in 1993 with the building of the first prototype/proof of concept aircraft.

After eight years in development, the GA8 Airvan was type-certificated by the Australian Civil Aviation Safety Authority to FAR 23 Amendment 48 requirements in December 2000 and subsequently updated to Amendment 54 status in early 2003. This was followed by certification by the United States Federal Aviation Administration and the Canadian Transport Canada in the same year. The European Aviation Safety Agency (EASA) certificated the Airvan in 2005.

The GA8 Airvan has now achieved export sales in the UK, Holland, Germany, Indonesia, New Zealand, South Africa, Botswana, Mozambique, Lesotho, USA, Canada and Belize in Central America, in addition to in-country sales in Western Australia, Queensland, Victoria, South Australia and the Northern Territory.

In October 2006, Gippsland Aeronautics announced that "the turbocharged prototype aircraft has commenced flight testing. The chosen engine is the Lycoming TIO 540 AH1A engine, which is a turbocharged version of the currently installed normally aspirated engine."

=== Future ===
On 18 June 2008, Gippsland Aeronautics announced it had won bidding to take over the type certificate of the GAF Nomad, and would probably be restarting production. The twin-engined, 18-seat reborn Nomad will be called the GA18, and will be re-engineered with new engines, propellers, glass cockpit and weight-saving measures.

The GA18 was originally planned to enter into service after the development and certification of the new 10-seat GA10 was completed, however by August 2020 development of the GA18 had ceased.

== Products ==
=== Current ===
- Gippsland GA200 Fatman
- GippsAero GA8 Airvan
- GippsAero GA10 Airvan

=== Planned ===
- GippsAero GA18 Nomad
