= Gippsland GA200 =

Low-wing single-engine agricultural aircraft

GA200 Fatman

General information
- Type: Light agricultural
- National origin: Australia
- Manufacturer: GippsAero

History
- Introduction date: March 1991
- First flight: 1990

The Gippsland GA200 Fatman is a low-wing, single-engine agricultural aircraft built by GippsAero.

== Development ==
Based loosely on the Piper Pawnee, the first two prototypes used damaged Pawnee frames. The third prototype, built in 1992, was the first all-original airframe. The GA200 was fully certificated on 1 March 1991.

Certificate of Type Approval No. 83-6 for the GA200 was issued by the Australian Civil Aviation Authority on that date; the first to be issued for a totally new aircraft design in Australia since the GAF Nomad, 20 years earlier. The certification basis was the Australian certification standards, Civil Aviation Orders, Sections 101.16 and 101.22. These standards in turn incorporated the airworthiness standards of Part 23 of the US Federal Aviation Regulations.

50 GA200 aircraft were manufactured at GippsAero's base at the Latrobe Valley Airport, 28 of which were exported to countries throughout the world including New Zealand, China, the United States, Canada, South Africa and Brazil.

In the late 1990s, GA200 production was scaled down to make way for the GA8 Airvan.

== Design ==
=== Wings ===
The "strut braced" design concept was chosen to allow the minimum possible weight for the wing, saving approximately 45 kg (100 lb) over a cantilever spar design. This allows a correspondingly greater maximum payload for a given empty weight. The configuration also provides a very “crashworthy” structure to provide a good “fly-on” capability following an obstacle strike. The design has been optimised for maximum strength-to-weight ratio by using “state of the art” finite element computer analysis methods. An initial conservative retirement life of 15,000 hours for critical structural components has been granted by the Australian Civil Aviation Safety Authority. This life can be extended as results of on-going tests becomes available.

The all-metal wing panels are significantly different from those of the Piper Pawnee. The GA200 wings have full-depth laminated fail-safe spars. The outboard section is joined to the inner section at the strut intersection by load distribution doublers. This allows the relatively easy replacement of the outer wing panels. All components are corrosion proofed in special workshops prior to assembly in GippsAeros main hangars one, two and three.

The Leading Edges consist of easily replaceable segments to minimise down-time due to bird strike and other minor leading edge impacts. These segments are not handed - one spare can be fitted at any position on either wing. This is unique to the GA200.

The semi-span wing flaps are of slotted design and are effective in all flight regimes. The 15 degrees ‘Take-Off’ position assists with early rising of the tail and main wheel lift off, thus reducing take-off ground roll significantly. At a hopper payload of 1050 kg the ground roll has been measured at approximately 420 metres (1380 ft) with zero wind and 15 degrees Celsius at sea level.

Full flap (38 degrees) allows a landing approach speed of approximately 50-55 knots at light weight. This allows comfortable short field landings with a typical ground roll of 200 metres (650 ft). The wing flaps can also be used in flight in agricultural operations and significantly reduce turn radius when the aircraft is fully loaded.

Another important design feature of the flap system is that there is no noticeable change in pitch trim with the extension of the flaps. This has been achieved by the incorporation of a simple interconnect system which applies bias to the elevator trim springs when the flap are extended.

Ailerons: The ailerons are gap sealed and provide light and responsive behaviour to minimise pilot fatigue. The ailerons allow a high roll rate of approximately 3 seconds from 45 degree bank through to 45 degree bank the other way at normal working airspeeds. This is unique to the GA200.

Wing Tips: These are removable assemblies to allow easy replacement in the event of damage. Their shape has evolved over a number of years of “in the field” testing to provide the best possible swath width without compromising aircraft performance, and maintaining small, controlled wingtip vortices.

=== Fuselage ===
The fuselage structure is a welded SAE 4130 chromium molybdenum steel tube assembly. The design has been optimised for maximum strength-to-weight ratio by using finite element computer analysis methods. The forward fuselage has been designed to progressively crumple in the event of a sudden forward deceleration.

Metal side panels attached by half turn ‘Dzus’ fasteners are fitted to both sides of the fuselage from the engine bay back past the rear cockpit. These allow ready access for ease of inspection, maintenance and cleaning. Additionally the rear fuselage upper turtledeck is easily removed for rear fuselage inspection, maintenance and cleaning.

The configuration of the pilot behind and above the load has been used. A second seat for transporting the loader driver or to allow aerial viewing by the farmer has been a long requested design feature. This seat is fitted to the right of the pilot seat. The side by side seating arrangement was chosen to minimise shift of the centre of gravity with cockpit load as well as to fully utilise the wide fuselage structure that was necessitated by the fitting of the larger 1070 litre (270 US gall) capacity hopper.

== Variants ==
GA200 Ag-trainer
With dual controls. Three built.
GA200B
200 with extended wingtips.
GA200C
Up-rated engine, constant speed propeller.

== Specifications (GA200) ==
Data from Jane's All the World's Aircraft 2000–2001

General characteristics

- Crew: 1
- Capacity: 1 pax / student / assistant / 776 L (205 US gal; 171 imp gal) hopper 726 L (192 US gal; 160 imp gal) in trainer versions)
- Length: 7.48 m (24 ft 6 in)
- Wingspan: 11.93 m (39 ft 2 in)
- Height: 2.33 m (7 ft 8 in) static
- Wing area: 19.6 m^{2} (211 sq ft)
- Aspect ratio: 7.3
- Empty weight: 770 kg (1,698 lb)
- Gross weight: 1,315 kg (2,899 lb) normal
- Max takeoff weight: 1,700 kg (3,748 lb) agricultural
- Fuel capacity: 214 L (57 US gal; 47 imp gal) in two integral wing tanks and small header tank in fuselage
- Powerplant: 1 × Lycoming IO-540-H2A5 6-cylinder air-cooled horizontally-opposed piston engine, 190 kW (250 hp) (de-rated from 260hp)
- Propellers: 2-bladed McCauley IA200/FA 84 52, 2.13 m (7 ft 0 in) diameter fixed-pitch metal propeller

Performance

- Cruise speed: 185 km/h (115 mph, 100 kn) at 305 m (1,001 ft)
- Stall speed: 100 km/h (62 mph, 54 kn) flaps up

91 km/h (57 mph; 49 kn) flaps down
84 km/h (52 mph; 45 kn) at typical landing weight flaps up
76 km/h (47 mph; 41 kn) at typical landing weight flaps down

- Rate of climb: 4.917 m/s (967.9 ft/min)
- Wing loading: 86.73 kg/m^{2} (17.76 lb/sq ft) agricultural
- Take-off run: 340 m (1,115 ft) at 1,600 kg (3,527 lb) AUW and 15° flap

== See also ==
Related development

- GippsAero GA8 Airvan
