= Latrobe Flying Museum =

Coordinates: 38°12′26″S 146°28′13″E

Latrobe Flying Museum is an Australian aviation museum located at Latrobe Regional Airport in Traralgon, Victoria, owned by former Royal Australian Air Force Squadron Leader and Trans Australia Airlines pilot Jeff Trappett. The aircraft collection consists of a CAC Sabre, P-51 Mustang, Douglas DC-3, CAC Winjeel and other aircraft. As of 2017 this museum is closed and non-functional.
