= Latrobe Regional Airport =

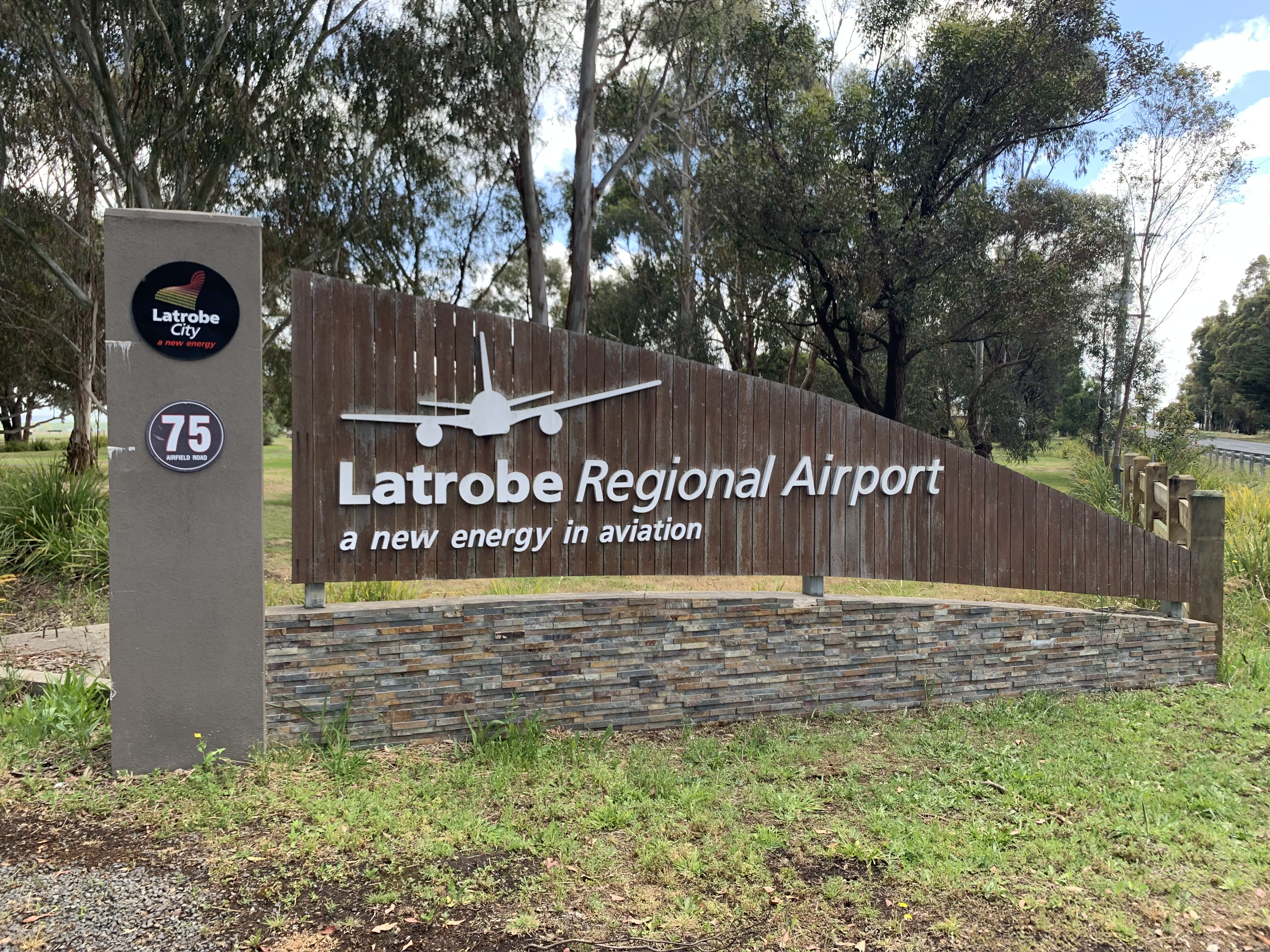
- IATA: TGN; ICAO: YLTV

Summary
- Airport type: Public
- Owner: Latrobe City Council
- Operator: Latrobe Regional Airport Board
- Location: Morwell, Victoria, Australia
- Elevation AMSL: 180 ft / 55 m
- Coordinates: 38°12′26″S 146°28′13″E

Map
- Location in Victoria

Runways
Direction	Length		Surface
Direction	m	ft	Surface
03R/21L	1,430	4,692	Asphalt
09/27	919	3,015	Gravel
03L/21R	537	1,762	Grass
- Sources: Australian AIP and aerodrome chart

Latrobe Regional Airport (formerly Latrobe Valley Airport and Traralgon Airport) (IATA: TGN, ICAO: YLTV) is located between the Latrobe Valley towns of Morwell and Traralgon in Victoria, Australia. The airport is about 160 kilometres east of Melbourne, off the Princes Highway, 4 nautical miles (7.4 km; 4.6 mi) west of Traralgon.

== Users ==
The airfield was originally located at Morwell and at Moe before moving to the present site. The terminal building contains some displays of aviation artifacts. It opened in 1958.

The Latrobe Valley Aero Club operates out of Latrobe Regional Airport, providing services to the surrounding community such as flight training, aircraft rental, air charter, scenic flights and air safaris. Bandicoot Adventure Flights operates vintage and World War II aircraft including Tiger Moths, a T-6 Texan and a Pitts Special. There is also the Latrobe Flying Museum – its fleet consists of a CAC Sabre, P-51 Mustang, a Commonwealth Aircraft Corporation Winjeel and a Douglas DC-3. As of 2017, this museum is closed.

GippsAero, manufacturer of the GA200 agricultural aircraft, the GA8 Airvan eight-seater utility aircraft, and the GA10 Airvan ten-seater utility aircraft, is based at the airport.

Airlines formerly flying to the airport include Aus-Air, Brindabella Airlines, Hazelton Airlines and Rex Airlines.

== Gallery ==
Aircraft

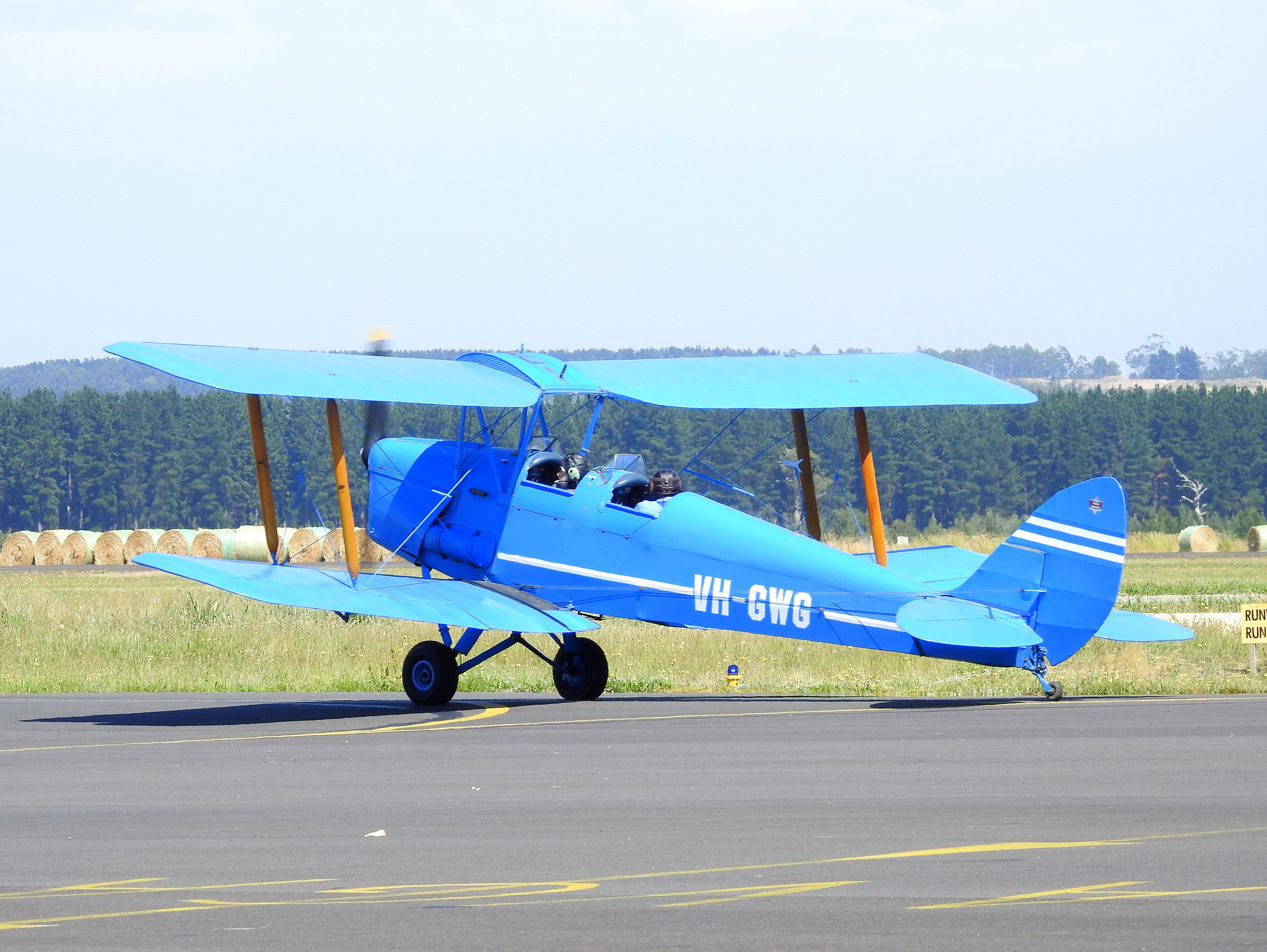
Bandicoot Adventure Flights de Havilland Tiger Moth DH.82A VH-GWG taxiing

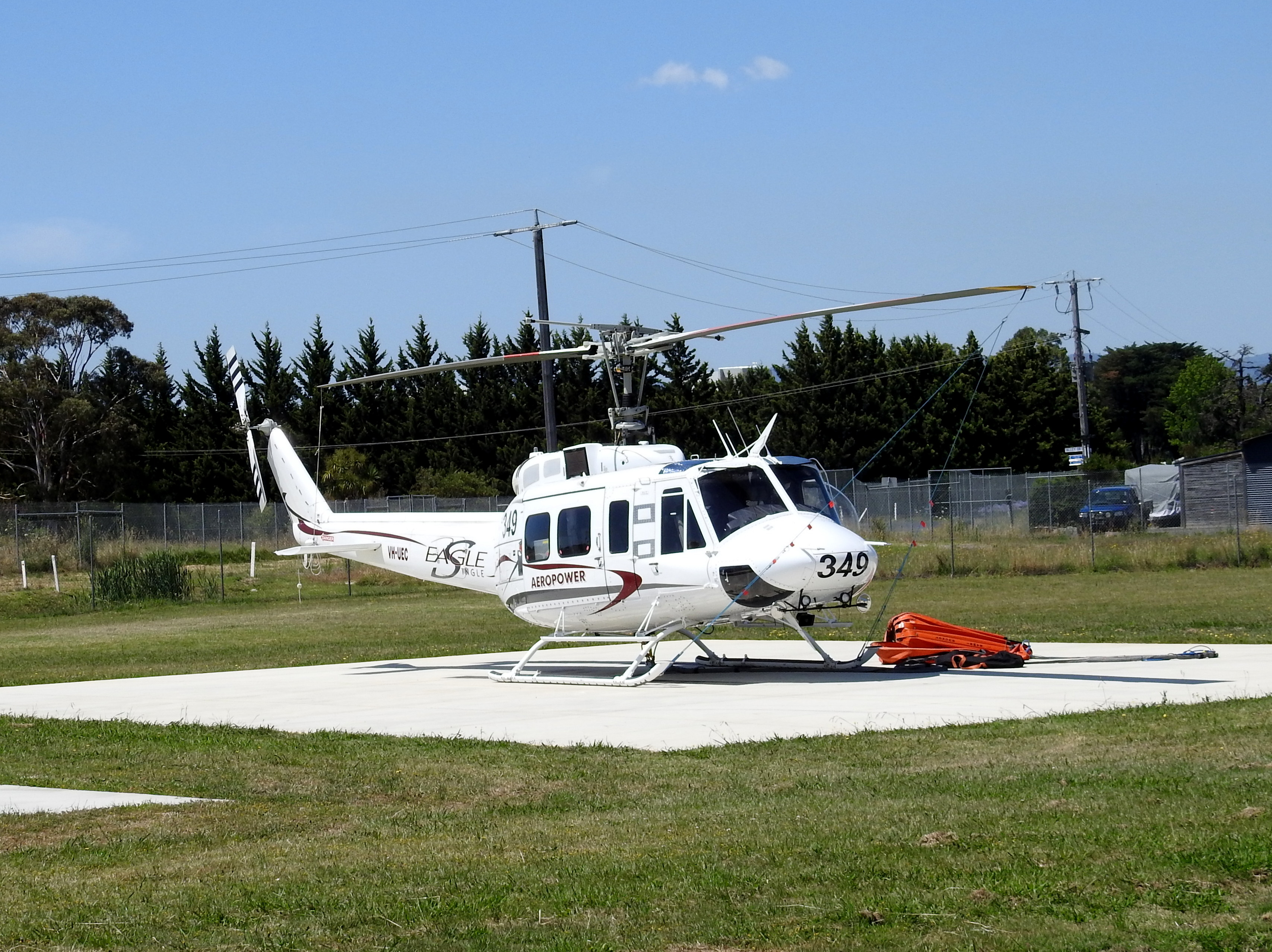
Aeropower Bell 212 Eagle Single with helicopter bucket

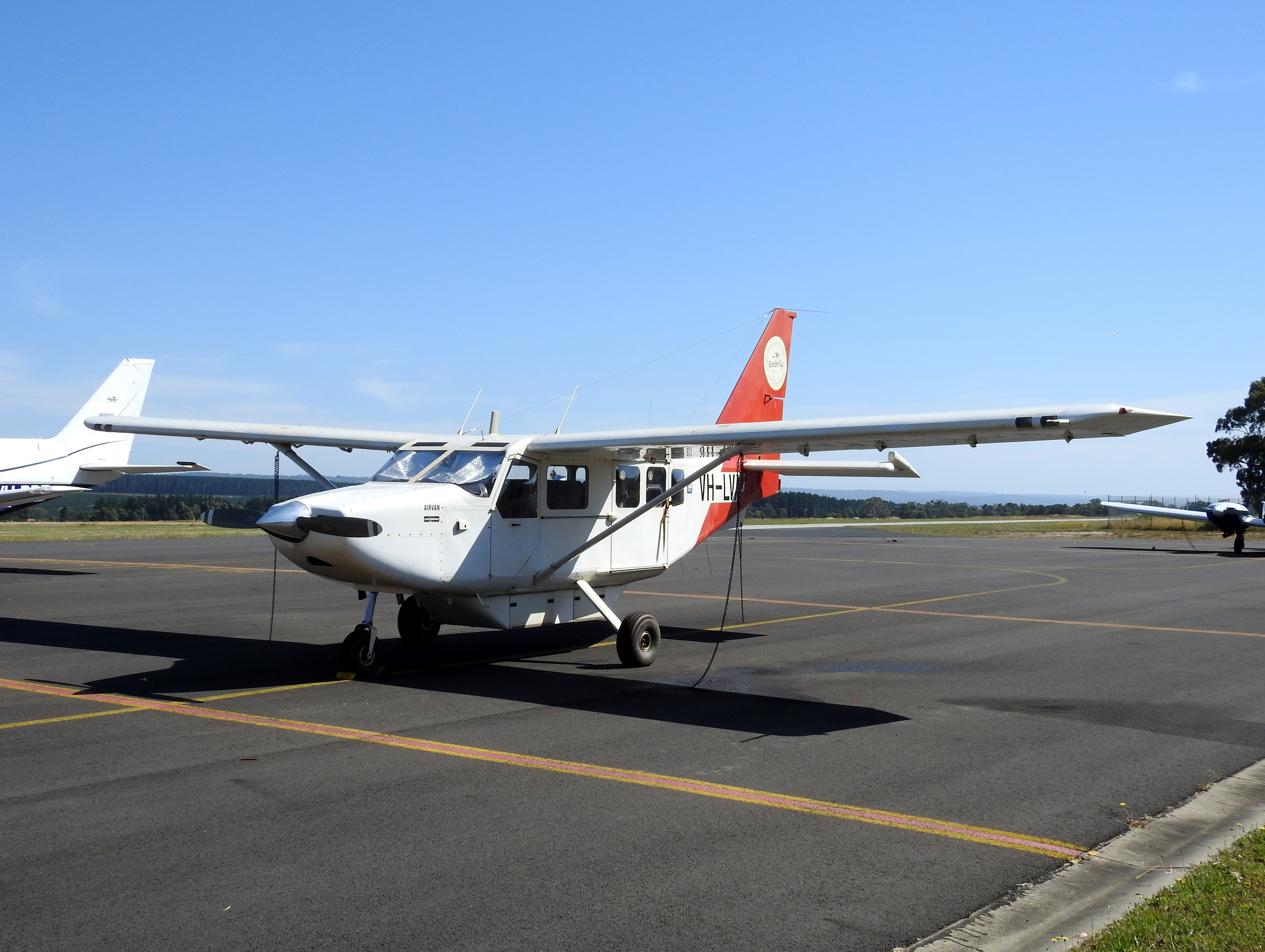
Kimberly Air Safaris' GippsAero GA8 Airvan

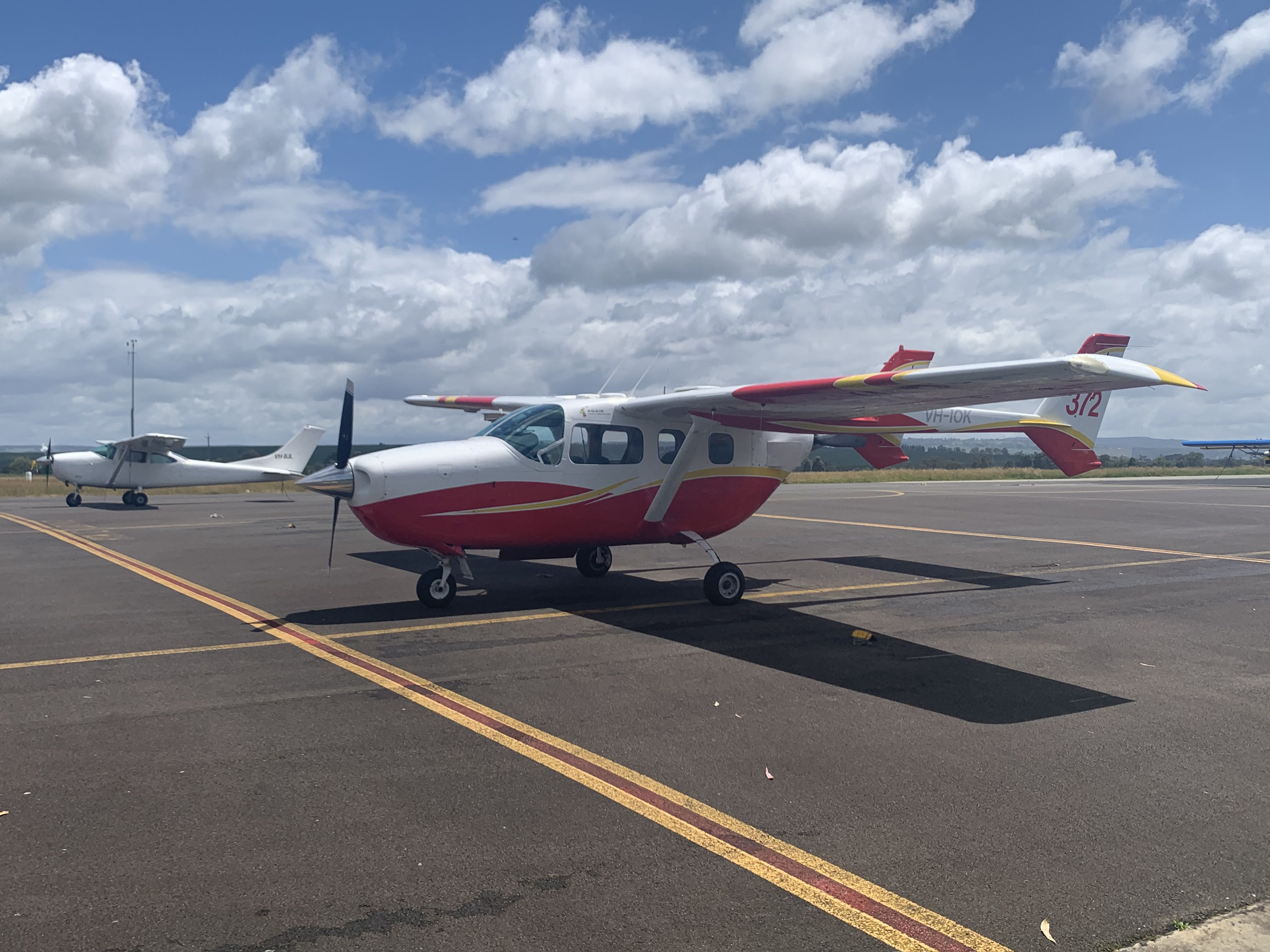
Cessna 337 operated by Agair Aerial Fire Fighting Solutions at YLTV
