= West Houston Airport =

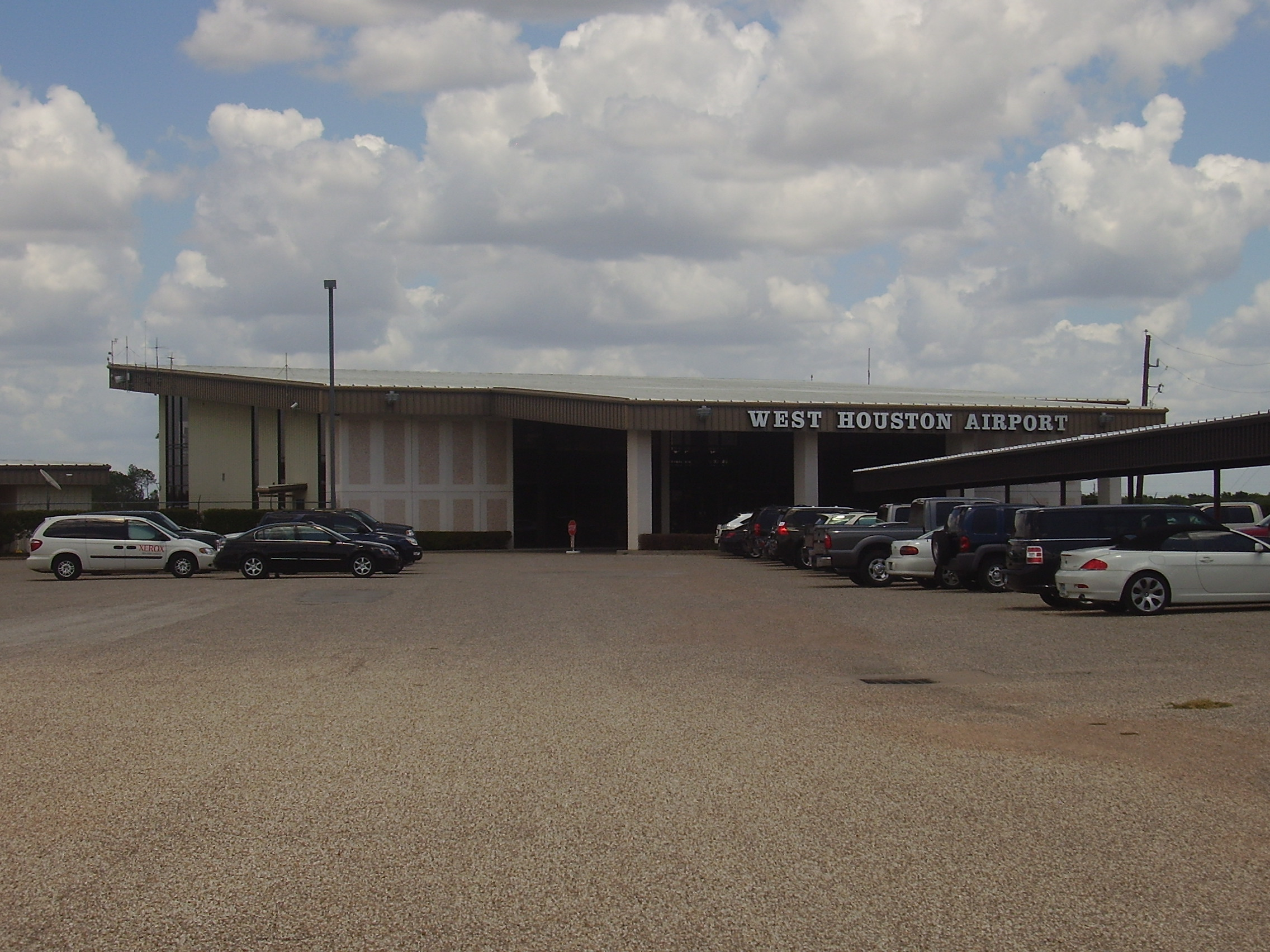
- IATA: IWS; ICAO: KIWS; FAA LID: IWS

Summary
- Airport type: Public use
- Owner: West Houston Airport Corp.
- Serves: Greater Katy
- Location: Houston
- Elevation AMSL: 111 ft (34 m)
- Coordinates: 29°49′06″N 095°40′21″W
- Website: WestHoustonAirport.com

Map
- Location within Texas Location within the United States

Runways
Direction	Length		Surface
Direction	ft	m	Surface
15/33	3,953	1,205	Asphalt

Statistics (2011)
- Aircraft operations: 103,000
- Source: Federal Aviation Administration

West Houston Airport (IATA: IWS, ICAO: KIWS, FAA LID: IWS) is a privately owned, public use airport in unincorporated Harris County, Texas, 15 miles (24,000 m) west of Downtown Houston in the Greater Katy area. It opened in 1962 and was known as Lakeside Airport until the early 1980s due to its location near the edge of Addicks reservoir.

The National Plan of Integrated Airport Systems for 2011–2015 categorized it as a general aviation reliever airport. Houston Air Route Traffic Control Center in Houston is the airport's designated ARTCC.

== Facilities ==
West Houston Airport covers 200 acres (81 ha) at an elevation of 111 feet (34 m). Its single runway, 15/33, is 3,953 by 75 feet (1,205 x 23 m) asphalt.

In 2016 the airport had 103,000 aircraft operations, average 282 per day: 68% local general aviation, 31% transient general aviation, and 1% air taxi.

The airport is home to more than 375 aircraft. Being privately owned, the airport does not receive federal funding for improvements. There is a landing fee for fixed-wing aircraft that's usually $10. There is also a US$10 Handling/Security/Facility fee will be invoiced to the aircraft's owner if incoming passengers do not make some sort of purchase to support the airport. The terminal building is a two-story facility containing conference rooms and normal airport facilities.

West Houston Airport was named as one of America's "Most Needed Airports" list by NATA (National Air Transportation Association)

== Past scheduled passenger airline service ==
In the mid 1980s, West Houston Airport was served by Air West (a commuter air carrier not to be confused with Hughes Airwest) with eight nonstop flights every weekday to Dallas Love Field operated with four engine, 50-passenger seat de Havilland Canada DHC-7 Dash 7 turboprops with these aircraft being STOL (short take off and landing) capable which was advantageous in light of the relatively short runway at IWS.

== See also ==
- List of airports in Texas
