= GippsAero GA10 =

Utility aircraft

GA10 Airvan
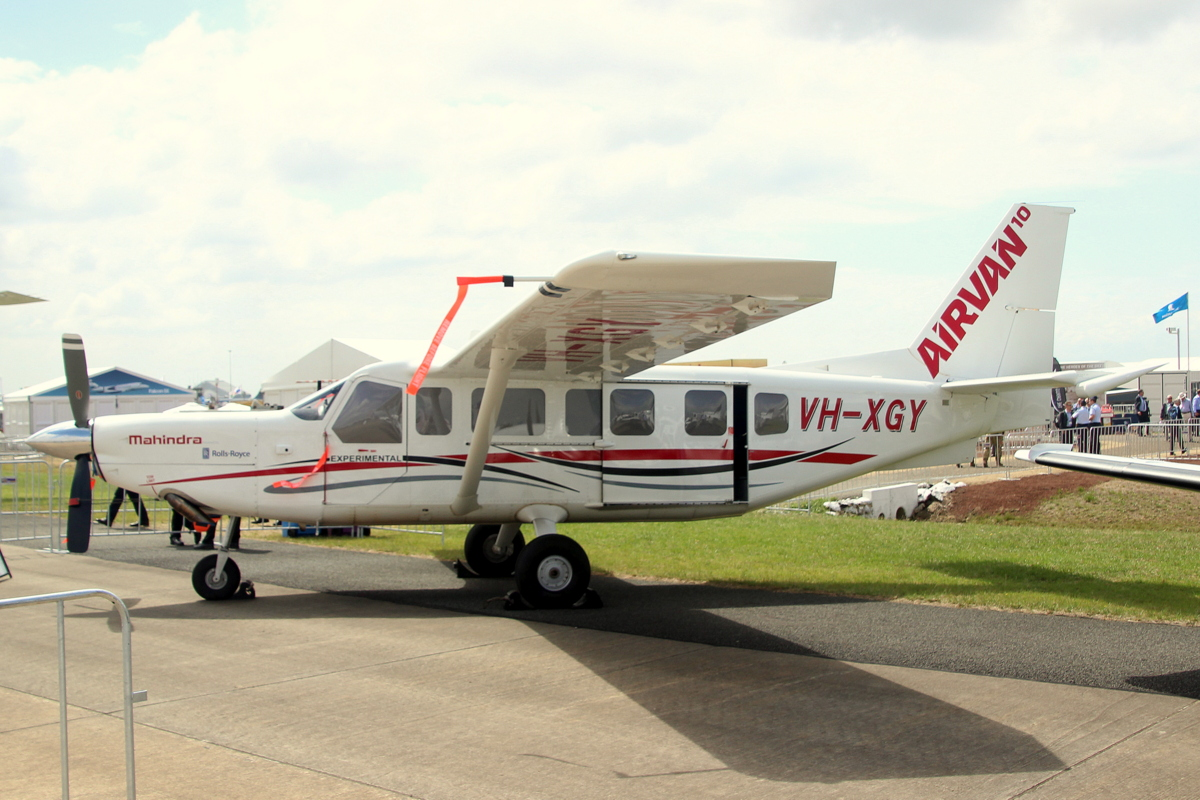
- GA10 prototype

General information
- Type: Utility/transport
- National origin: Australia
- Manufacturer: GippsAero

History
- Manufactured: 2012–2020
- First flight: 1 May 2012
- Developed from: GippsAero GA8

The GippsAero GA10 Airvan is a 10-seat, turboprop, single-engine utility aircraft being developed by GippsAero of Victoria, Australia.

== Development ==
Its 20-minute first flight was completed in May 2012. In mid-2015, the aircraft was planned to be certified in 2015, but later in the year no schedule was claimed. It was certificated by the Australian Civil Aviation Safety Authority on 19 May 2017, as well as the American Federal Aviation Administration.

In January 2018, two GA10s were flying, the prototype and the first production aircraft, however these were not delivered.

On 4 June 2018, during flight tests supported by the National Test Pilot School from the Mojave Air & Space Port in southern California, a GA10 crashed in the Mojave Desert. The two pilots parachuted safely from about 5,000 ft (1,500 m) above ground.

On 24 August 2018, the first customer for the GA10 Airvan was announced to be Major Blue Air, Botswana. Its unit cost in 2018 was $1.7 million.

In November 2020, the production of the GA8 Airvan and the GA10 Airvan stopped. The then-owner, giant Indian engineering conglomerate Mahindra, decided it would only produce parts.

In 2023, George Morgan, one of the two founders of Gippsland Aeronautics, bought back the company and has been working to restart the factory at Latrobe Regional Airport.

On 26 October 2024, George Morgan and Peter Furlong were inducted into the Australian Aviation Hall of Fame for their contributions to Aviation in Australia and around the world.

== Design ==
After successful development of the eight-seat GA8 Airvan piston-engined aircraft, the design has been stretched and re-engined with a turboprop engine to increase seating and payload capacity, resulting in the GA10. With many piston-engined GA8 aircraft being operated in remote areas, the JetA/JetA1-powered GA10 is intended to appeal to general aviation customers.

The GA10 retains the aerodynamic design of the GA8 and the intent is to retain as many current production parts as possible. A design requirement is for a five-hour endurance with eight occupants (including pilot), and a maximum fuel load of 550 litres. Similarly to the GA8, a STOL kit will be developed for the GA10.

The GA10 should be a capable intelligence, surveillance and reconnaissance (ISR) platform, after the piston GA8, carrying an electro-optical/infrared sensor (EO/IR) ball in a modified underside baggage bay for an unobstructed 360° view.

== Specifications ==
Data from Airvan 10 brochure

General characteristics

- Crew: 1
- Capacity: 9 passengers or 635 kg freight (with full fuel), 164 ft^{3} / 4.43 m^{3}
- Length: 33 ft 6 in (10.21 m)
- Wingspan: 40 ft 7 in (12.37 m)
- Height: 12 ft 9 in (3.89 m)
- Empty weight: 2,475 lb (1,123 kg)
- Max takeoff weight: 4,750 lb (2,155 kg)
- Fuel capacity: 153 U.S. gal (580l)
- Cabin: 45 in / 1.1 m high, 50 in / 1.3 m wide, 16 ft 1 in / 4.9 m long
- Powerplant: 1 × Rolls-Royce 250-B17F/2 turboprop, 451 hp (336 kW) 2,030 rpm
- Propellers: 3-bladed Hartzell HC-D3F-7H

Performance

- Maximum speed: 157 kn (181 mph, 291 km/h)
- Cruise speed: 145 kn (167 mph, 269 km/h)
- Range: 550 nmi (630 mi, 1,020 km) 1h IFR reserve, 700 nmi without
- Endurance: 5 hours
- Service ceiling: 20,000 ft (6,100 m)
- Rate of climb: 1,000 ft/min (5.1 m/s)
- Takeoff to 50 ft: 1,600 ft / 488 m
- Fuel burn: 24 gph / 92 L/h

== See also ==
Related development

- GippsAero GA8 Airvan

Aircraft of comparable role, configuration, and era

- Cessna 208 Caravan
- PAC P-750 XSTOL
- Pilatus PC-6 Porter
- Quest Kodiak
