= GippsAero GA8 Airvan =

Single engine shoulder-wing utility aircraft

GA8 Airvan
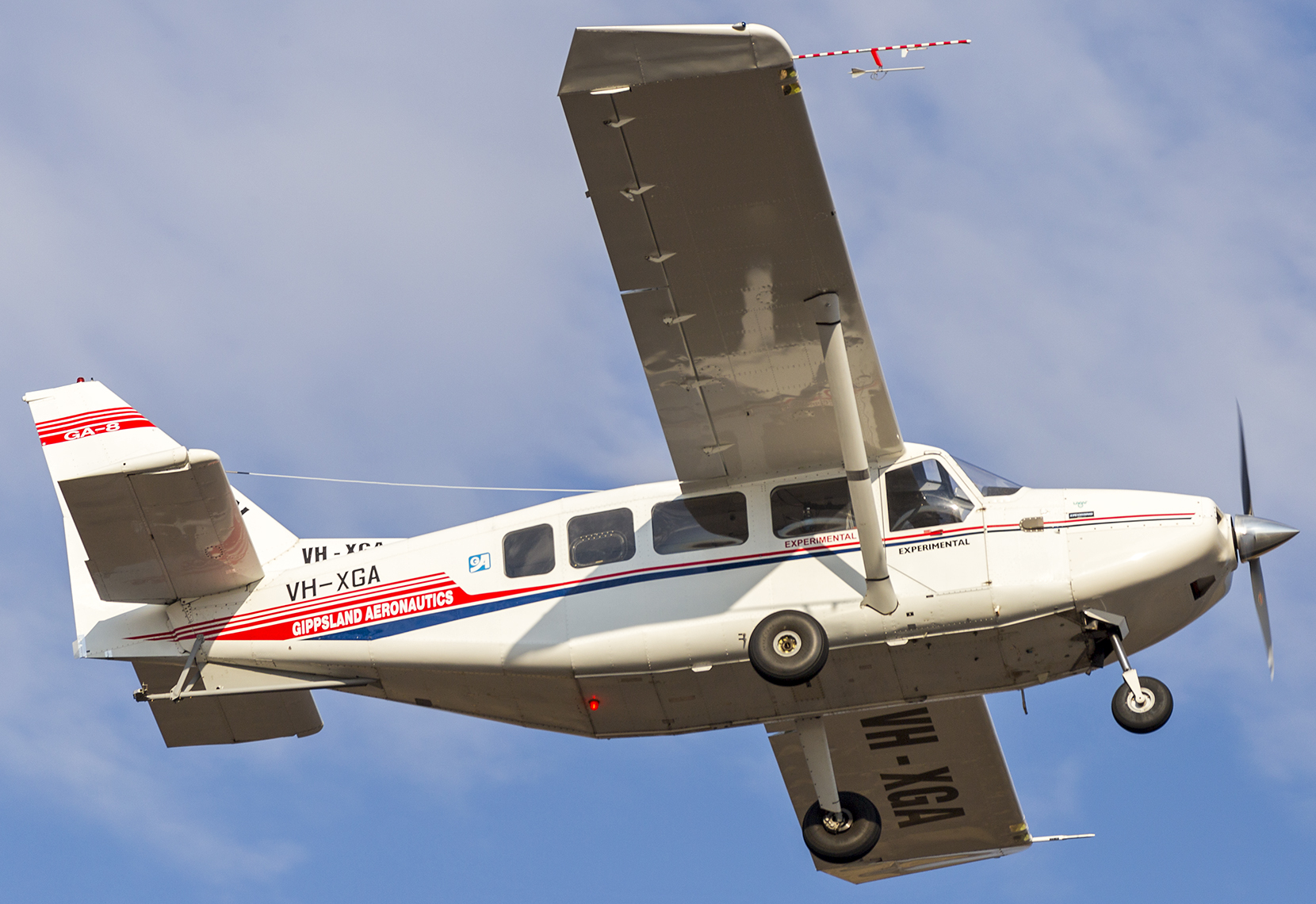
- Gippsland Aeronautics GA8 Airvan 8

General information
- Type: Utility aircraft/Transport
- National origin: Australia
- Manufacturer: GippsAero
- Primary user: United States Civil Air Patrol
- Number built: 262

History
- Manufactured: 2000–2020, 2025–present
- Introduction date: December 2000
- First flight: 3 March 1995
- Developed into: GippsAero GA10

The GippsAero GA8 Airvan is a single-engined utility aircraft manufactured by GippsAero (formerly named Gippsland Aeronautics) of Victoria, Australia. It can seat up to eight people, including the pilot.

The GA8 has been designed for use in remote areas and from austere air strips, performing tasks such as passenger services, freight, sightseeing, parachuting, observation, and intelligence, surveillance and reconnaissance (ISR) and search and rescue operations. Its design emphasises ruggedness and ease of use. First flown on 3 March 1995 and type certified under Federal Aviation Administration (FAA) Part 23 requirements during summer 2004, the GA8 has been flown by a diverse range of operators throughout the world.

Since its introduction, improved models featuring more powerful engines have been introduced; an enlarged turboprop-powered derivative, designated as the GippsAero GA10, has been developed. A floatplane model of the GA8 has also been produced. At EAA Oshkosh 2014, the GA8 Airvan was officially renamed as the Mahindra Airvan 8 as a reflection of GippsAero's recent acquisition by Indian conglomerate Mahindra Group. The aircraft was produced in Australia; establishment of a North American final assembly line to produce the type was proposed at one time.

In November 2020, Mahindra Aerospace announced that production would cease at that time, citing the financial effects of the global economic slowdown due to the COVID-19 pandemic. In November 2023, GippsAero's cofounder, George Morgan, re-purchased the company and announced his intentions to resume production of the GA8 Airvan. In June 2025, production recommenced of new aircraft manufacturing with GA8 Airvan serial number 263. New-build GA8 Airvans should be operational in 2026.

== Development ==
The prototype GA8 Airvan circa 1999

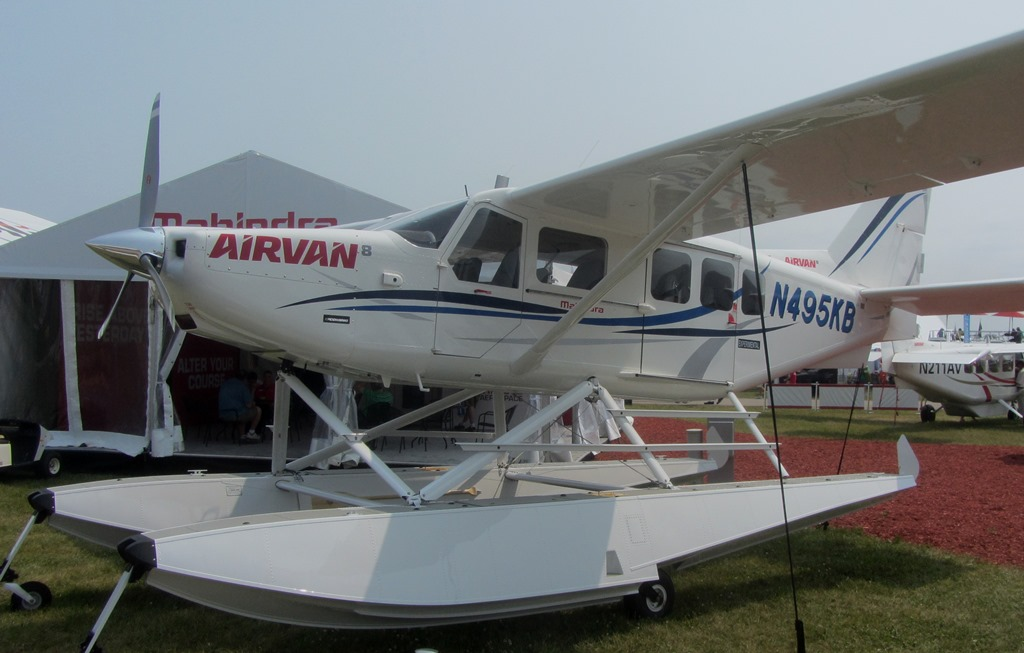
GA-8 with floats

According to aviation publication Flying, the aircraft was designed to fill a market niche perceived by the manufacturer between the six-seat Cessna 206 and fourteen-seat Cessna 208 Caravan models. The GA8's design was primarily produced by Peter Furlong. The aircraft was certified as conforming with the stringent Part 23 requirements of the Federal Aviation Administration (FAA); accordingly, elements were subject to dynamic testing, as well as the controllability of the aircraft with the loss of any primary flight control validated. The GA8 received its type certification in 2004.

The GA8 has been used in various roles, including passenger services, freight, sightseeing, parachuting, observation, and search and rescue operations. It has been designed for use in remote areas and from austere air strips.

A turbocharged version of the aircraft was in planning from 2002, and the prototype turbocharged aircraft commenced flight testing in October 2006. In February 2009, Gippsland Aeronautics announced that the Australian Civil Aviation Safety Authority had issued an amendment to the GA8 type certificate to cover the turbocharged variant. This version is designated as the GA8-TC320 and is powered by a 320 HP Lycoming TIO-540-AH1A turbocharged fuel-injected engine. The first deliveries of this model took place in February 2009; within two years, numerous GA8-TC320 Airvans had been delivered to customers in Australia and New Zealand.

On 8 July 2010, the GA8-TC320 Airvan became the first Australian designed and manufactured aircraft to circumnavigate the Earth. Piloted by Kenneth Evers and Timothy Pryse, the circumnavigational flight was recognised by Federation Aeronautique Internationale (FAI), the world's governing body for air sports and aeronautical world records, as an official circumnavigation in accordance with FAI rules. The pilots were awarded the Des Kelly Special Achievement Award, and on 31 March 2011, Australian Flying recognised the flight as a first in Australian aviation history.

A turboprop derivative of the GA8, the GA10, is also being developed. It is a slightly stretched 10-seat capacity aircraft powered by a Rolls-Royce 250-B17F/2 turboprop engine. It is planned for the GA10 to retain as many common parts with the GA8 as possible.

During 2005, a floatplane model of the GA8 underwent evaluation. In 2011, the company announced that it was preparing to put the float-equipped model of the GA8 into production in partnership with American aviation float manufacturer Wipaire.

In December 2010, a Supplemental Type Certificate (STC) was issued to the manufacturer for a 200 lb. increase in MTOW.

In September 2012, the company announced that Soloy Aviation Solutions had been appointed as a GA8 component distributor for the US market. During November 2012, West Coast Aviation Services was appointed as an authorised dealer of the aircraft itself. In January 2013, a second US company, Summit Aviation, became an authorised dealer of the GA8 in the US market; Sumit reportedly planned to focus on government and surveillance aircraft sales.

At EAA Oshkosh 2014, the GA8 Airvan was renamed Mahindra Airvan 8; this rebranding is a reflection of GippsAero's recent acquisition by Indian conglomerate Mahindra Group. At the event, a company spokesperson announced that plans were underway to establish a new assembly line to produce the aircraft in North America. Mahindra has also undertaken substantial investments into its Australian facilities for the purpose of expanding its production capacity.

== Design ==
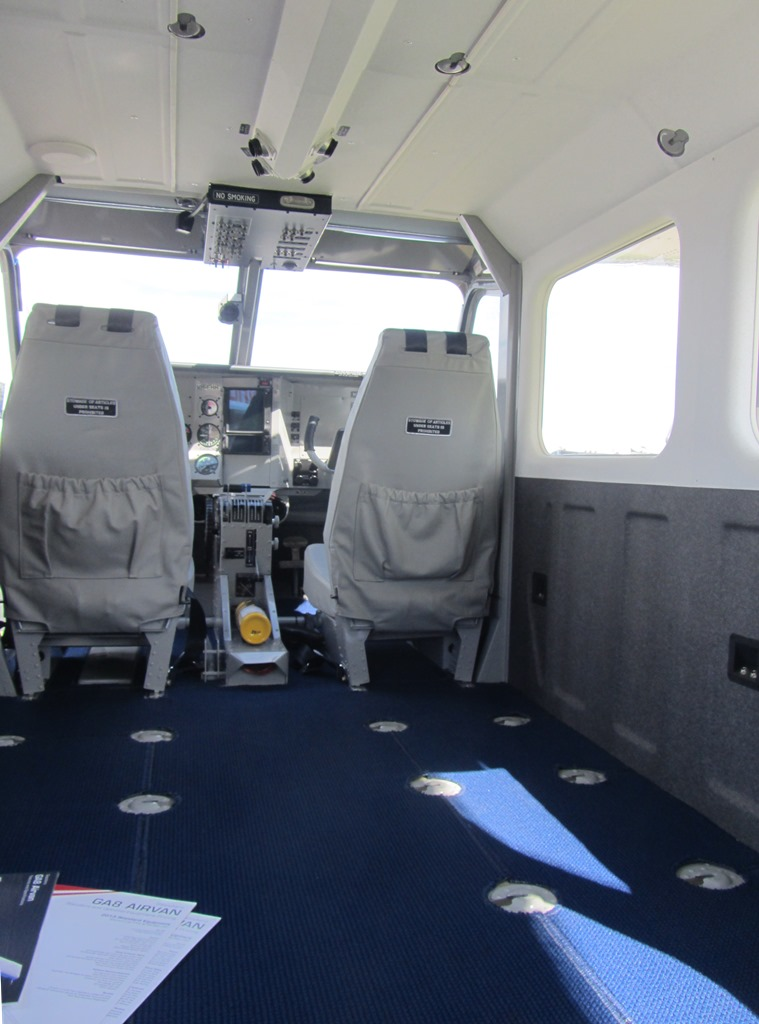
Airvan interior

The GA8 is an eight-seat utility aircraft designed for operations in the Australian Outback. The GA8 is powered by a single Lycoming IO-540 piston engine, replaced by a Rolls-Royce 250-B17F/2 turboprop in its GA10 derivative. It can take off within 525 ft (160 m), and can operate from a 1,000 ft (300 m) air strip under average conditions. Aviation International News has described its handling as forgiving, responsible, and akin to smaller aircraft.

The aircraft has a configuration similar to the Cessna 208 Caravan, with a rectangular fuselage. In standard seating, each passenger has a rectangular window bulged outwards to improve the downwards view. The shoulder wing aft of the pilot improves its visibility, notably upwards. It has an aisle between the seats unlike other bush planes, cabin ventilation is evenly distributed, and upholstery is modular for rapid replacement. It has been designed to ease maintenance with minimal tooling and maximised accessibility. The cabin rear door can be opened mid-flight.

Dedicated configurations are available for skydiving, freight and intelligence, surveillance and reconnaissance (ISR) missions. It can carry up to 440 lb (200 kg) within an optional cargo pod, accessible through a side-door and rear-mounted hatch. For ISR missions, multiple sensors can be contained in a modular pod, such as a Wescam-supplied surveillance camera; the sensors can be retractable to appear as an ordinary cargo pod. Mission workstations can be secured upon the standard seat mounts for three operators in a standard ISR configuration.

The airframe and onboard systems are designed for durability and simplicity. The spring suspended tricycle undercarriage is oil-free; no fuel selectors have to be managed with the 92.2 U.S. gallons (349 liters) wing tanks feeding a single sump tank under the cabin floor. The simple wing has mechanically actuated flaps. The wings are rated for 92,000 hours; the lowest lifetime structural fitting, the aft vertical stabilizer fitting, have to be replaced at 15,000 hours. Avionics include a Garmin G500 multi-function display, Garmin GTN750 and 650 touchscreen satellite navigation units, and backup analog instruments.

== Variants ==
GA8
Production version with a Textron Lycoming IO-540-K1A5 engine.
GA8-TC-320
Variant with a turbocharged Textron Lycoming TIO-540-AH1A engine.

== Operators ==
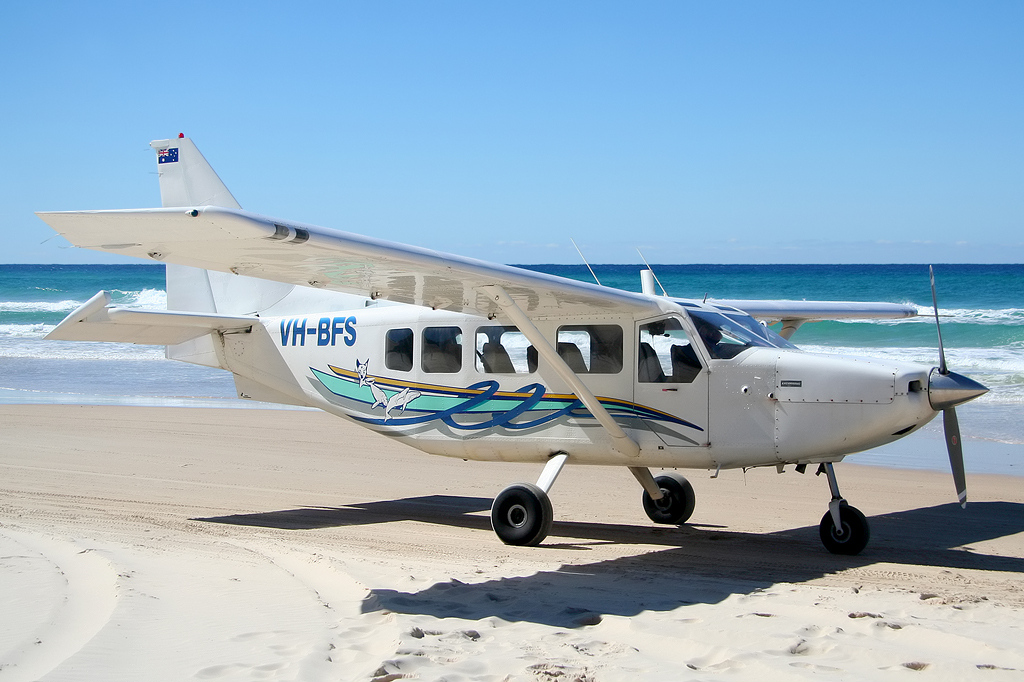
On a K'gari Island beach, Australia

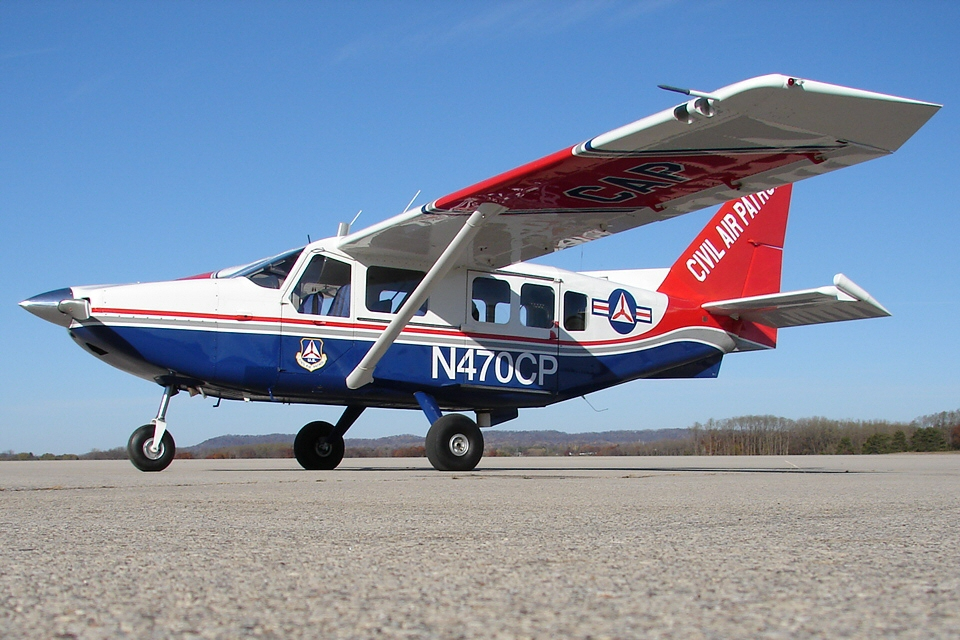
A Civil Air Patrol GA8 Airvan

228 Airvan 8s were in service as of July 2019.

=== Civil ===
The GA8 is popular with air charter companies, skydiving operators and small feeder air carriers. Larger operators include the Civil Air Patrol (CAP) which at one time flew 18 Airvans for search and rescue operations and long range disaster response and relief as well as airborne damage assessment missions. Beginning in 2022, CAP started phasing the Airvan out of their fleet. Mission Aviation Fellowship Australia operates 11 Airvans, providing air-transport services in developing countries. Mission Aviation Fellowship Suriname operates three Airvans. Operators include the following:

- Aeroclubul Romaniei (Romanian National Airclub), Romania
- Air Fraser Island, Australia
- Air Kimberley, Australia
- California Highway Patrol
- Modesto Police Department
- Circle Air, Iceland
- Fly Broome, Australia
- Glenorchy Air, New Zealand
- Golden Bay Air, New Zealand
- True South Flights, New Zealand
- Air Kaikoura, New Zealand
- Grant Aviation, Alaska, USA
- Mission Aviation Fellowship - MAF - Suriname (Surinaamse Zendings Vliegdienst), Suriname
- Maya Island Air, Belize
- OFD Ostfriesischer-Flug-Dienst, Germany
- Kakadu Air, Australia
- SDIS66, Perpignan, France (wildfire surveillance)
- Delta Air, Botswana
- Moremi Air, Botswana

=== Military ===
Lesotho

- Lesotho Defence Force

== Accidents and incidents ==
On 14 July 2019, a GA8 Airvan of Skydive Umeå crashed on the island of Storsandskär, Sweden, killing its nine occupants. Structural failure of a wing was suspected as a cause. The GA8 Airvan was grounded by the Civil Aviation Safety Authority (CASA) in Australia, Civil Aviation Authority in New Zealand, and the European Aviation Safety Agency (EASA) in the European Union. The grounding order was issued on 20 July and was due to run until 3 August, but was lifted early as CASA found there is no evidence for an unsafe condition, and the EASA said the wrecked aircraft had been exposed to aerodynamic loads beyond certification.

== Specifications ==
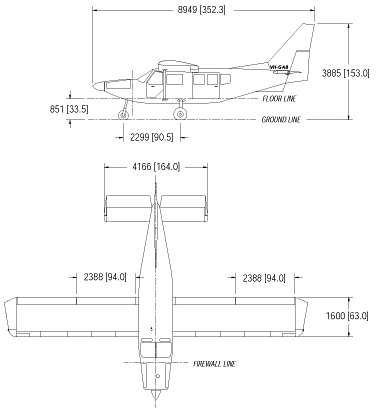
Top and side view

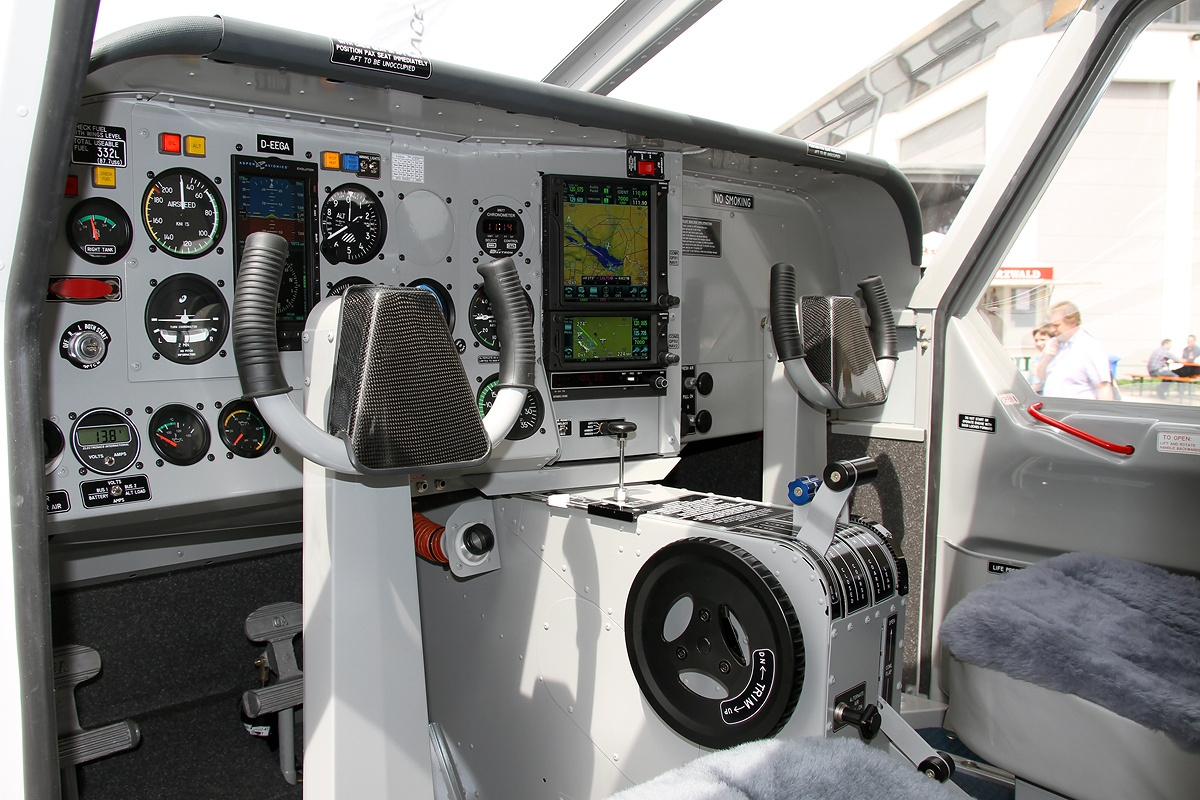
Flight deck

Data from Jane's All The World's Aircraft 2003–2004

General characteristics

- Crew: 1
- Capacity: Seven passengers
- Length: 8.95 m (29 ft 4 in)
- Wingspan: 12.28 m (40 ft 3 in)
- Height: 3.89 m (12 ft 9 in)
- Wing area: 19.32 m^{2} (208.0 sq ft)
- Aspect ratio: 7.9:1
- Empty weight: 997 kg (2,198 lb)
- Max takeoff weight: 1,814 kg (3,999 lb)
- Fuel capacity: 340 L (75 imp gal; 90 US gal)
- Powerplant: 1 × Textron Lycoming IO-540-K1A5 air-cooled flat-six, 220 kW (300 hp)
- Propellers: 2-bladed Hartzell F8475R constant speed propeller

Performance

- Maximum speed: 241 km/h (150 mph, 130 kn) at 1,525 metres (5,003 feet)
- Cruise speed: 222 km/h (138 mph, 120 kn) at 3,050 metres (10,010 feet)
- Stall speed: 97 km/h (60 mph, 52 kn) (flaps down)
- Range: 1,352 km (840 mi, 730 nmi)
- Endurance: Six hours
- Service ceiling: 6,100 m (20,000 ft)
- Rate of climb: 4.00 m/s (788 ft/min)

== See also ==
Related development

- GippsAero GA10 Airvan

Aircraft of comparable role, configuration, and era

- Cessna 206
- Cessna 208
- Gavilán G358
