= Carandbike.com =

Indian automotive news website

- Carandbike
- Company type: Private
- Website type: Automotive
- Available in: English
- Founded: 2015
- Headquarters: Mumbai, {{{location_country}}}
- CEO: Mohammed Turra
- Industry: Automobile
- Services: New Cars, New Bikes and Used cars News
- Parent: Mahindra Group; NDTV
- Divisions: Mahindra First Choice Wheels Limited
- Website: www.carandbike.com
- Current status: Active

Carandbike.com is an Indian automotive tech platform for new cars, new bikes and used cars, founded in 2015. It covers news about the automobile industry and is currently owned by the Mahindra Group, having been acquired from NDTV. The platform is also known as NDTV Auto and serves as a marketplace for both new and used cars, while also publishing reviews from the automotive sector.

Girish Karkera is the current editor-in-chief of Carandbike.

== History ==
Carandbike.com was launched in 2015 and was operated by Fifth Gear Ventures. It was part of the media house NDTV before being acquired by Mahindra & Mahindra through its unit, Mahindra First Choice Wheels Limited.

In 2016, NDTV Limited held 39.57 percent of the company, while 39.58 percent was held by NDTV Convergence Ltd.

In January 2016, Carandbike.com tied up with Mahindra Group for the launch of the KUV100. In January 2018, Tata Motors partnered with Carandbike.com for the online bookings of the Tata Tiago.

== Carandbike Awards ==
The company has established Carandbike Awards to recognize the best in the automobile industry.

== See also ==
- Mahindra Group
- NDTV
