= KUV =

KUV or kuv may refer to:

- Gunsan Airport (IATA: KUV), an airport serving Gunsan, North Jeolla Province, South Korea
- Kundara railway station (Indian Railways station code: KUV), a railway station in Kerala, India
- Teor-Kur language (ISO 639-3: kuv), an Austronesian language of the Central–Eastern Malayo-Polynesian branch spoken near Kei Island, Indonesia
- Mahindra KUV100, a subcompact SUV
