= Mahindra Truck and Bus Division =

Indian commercial vehicle manufacturer

- Type: Subsidiary
- Industry: Automotive
- Founded: 2005
- Headquarters: Pune, Maharashtra, India
- Area served: India, Bangladesh, Nepal, Sri Lanka
- Key people: Rajesh Jejurikar (ED)
- Products: Commercial Vehicles
- Number of employees: 900 approx. (Mar-2014)
- Parent: Mahindra & Mahindra
- Website: mahindratruckandbus.com

Mahindra Truck and Bus Division, formerly called Mahindra Navistar / Mahindra International, is an Indian commercial vehicle manufacturer formed in 2005 from a joint venture between Navistar International (49%) of the American and Indian automobile maker Mahindra & Mahindra (51%). It has been demerged into Mahindra & Mahindra Ltd and became a separate division.

Mahindra Truck and Bus Division's head office is located in Chinchwad, Pune, and its manufacturing line is inside Mahindra Vehicles Manufacturers Ltd., Chakan, Pune.

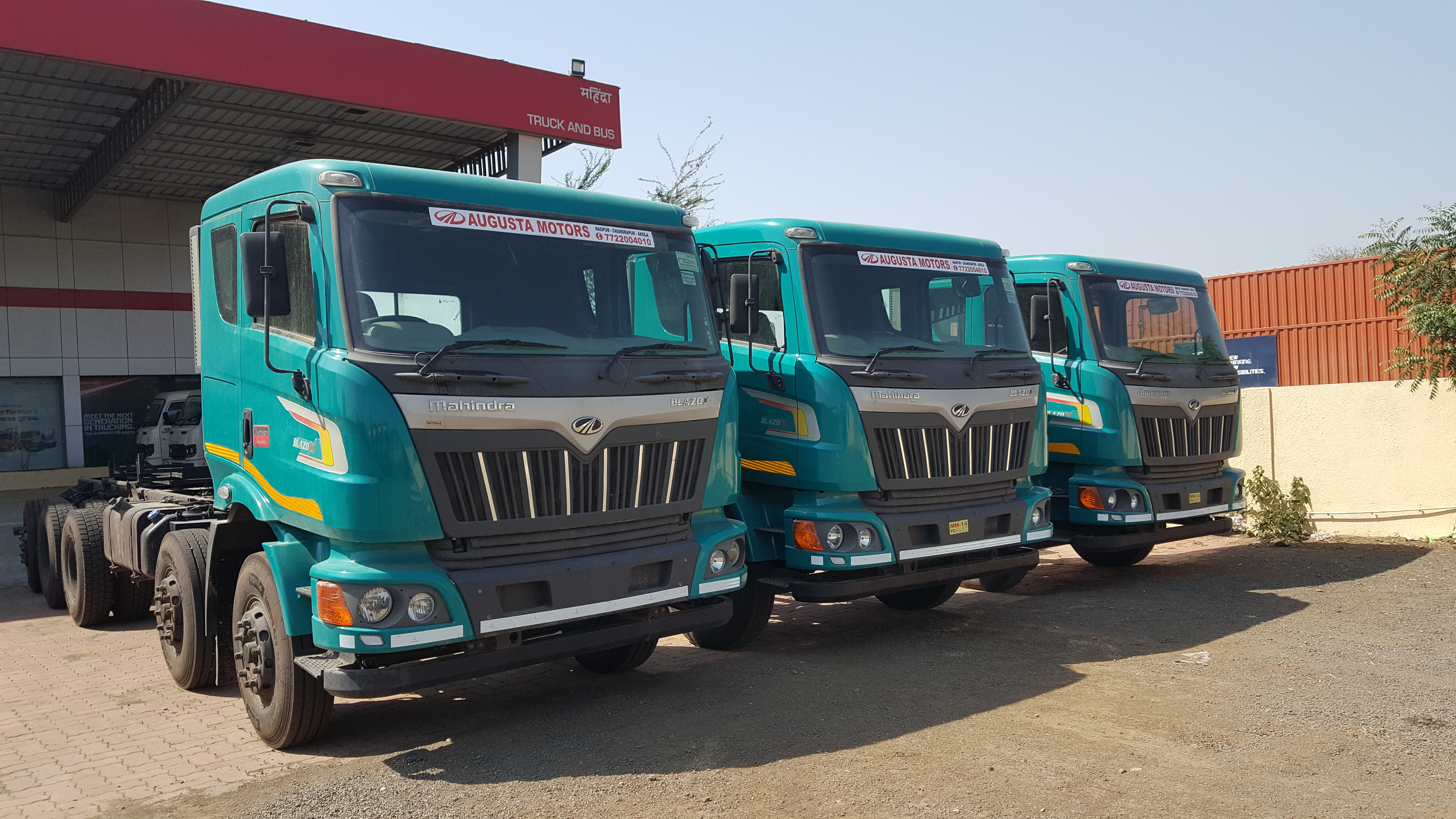
Mahindra Blazo 37T rigid trucks at a dealership in 2019 at Nagpur, Maharashtra.

== Products ==
=== HCV ===
- BlazoX 28 (28T GVW, Truck, Tipper, 276 hp)
- BlazoX 35 (35T GVW, Truck, Tipper, 276 hp)
- BlazoX 40 (39T GVW, Tractor Trailer, 276 hp)
- BlazoX 42 (42T GVW, Truck, 276 hp)
- BlazoX 46 (45T GVW, Tractor Trailer, 276 hp)
- BlazoX 49 (49T GVW, Truck, 276 hp)
- BlazoX 55 (55T GVW, Tractor Trailer, 276 hp)

=== ICV ===
- Furio 10 (10T GVW, Truck, 123 hp)
- Furio 11 (11T GVW, Truck, 138 hp)
- Furio 12 (12T GVW, Truck, 138 hp)
- Furio 14 (14T GVW, Truck, 138 hp)
- Furio 14HD (13T GVW, Truck, 138 hp)
- Furio 16 (16T GVW, Truck, 138 hp)
- Furio 17 (17T GVW, Truck, 138 hp)

=== LCV ===
- Furio 7 (7T GVW, Truck, 81 hp)
- Furio 7HD (7T GVW, Truck, Tipper, 122 hp)
- Jayo (5T GVW, Truck, 80 hp)

=== Bus ===
- Cruzio (12-51 seat, 80-128 hp)
- Cruzio Grande (32-72 seat, 138 hp)

== Other initiatives ==
In 2016, the Mahindra Truck and Bus Division announced a joined road safety initiative with the Ministry of Road Transport and Highways, the national #HaveaSafeJourney (#HASJ) awareness campaign. This involved a writing contest for 30 short stories related to road safety issues, which the following year were published as a book. Among notable writers contributing to the book were Tuhin Sinha, who also acted as project advisor, Kiran Manral and Pankaj Dubey.
