= Ratan Jalan =

Businessman

Ratan Jalan (born March 1, 1954) is the founder and principal consultant of Medium Healthcare Consulting which was started in 2008. From year 2000 to 2008, Ratan was the CEO of Apollo Health and Lifestyle Limited, part of the Apollo Hospitals Group. During his association with Apollo, he created Apollo Clinic Chains as a franchise model, and The Cradle Exclusive birthing center. He specializes in Healthcare Marketing, and writes articles frequently for industry magazines. He has participated as one of the panelists during Harvard Business School Centennial Summit, and has co-authored an article on "Impact of Entrepreneurs on Consumer-Driven Health Care" during the summit. He has also published article titled "Eye on the Indian Market" in American Marketing Association's Marketing Power Journal, where he talks about Healthcare Franchising and Innovative Business Model. Ratan is an alumnus of Indian Institute of Technology Kharagpur and Harvard Business School. After his engineering degree, he started his career in information technology industry with HCL Technologies and then moved to advertising at Lintas (now Lowe Lintas). Ratan was awarded the Marketing Impact of the Year Award by S.P. Jain Institute of Management and Research.
