= Mahindra Genio =

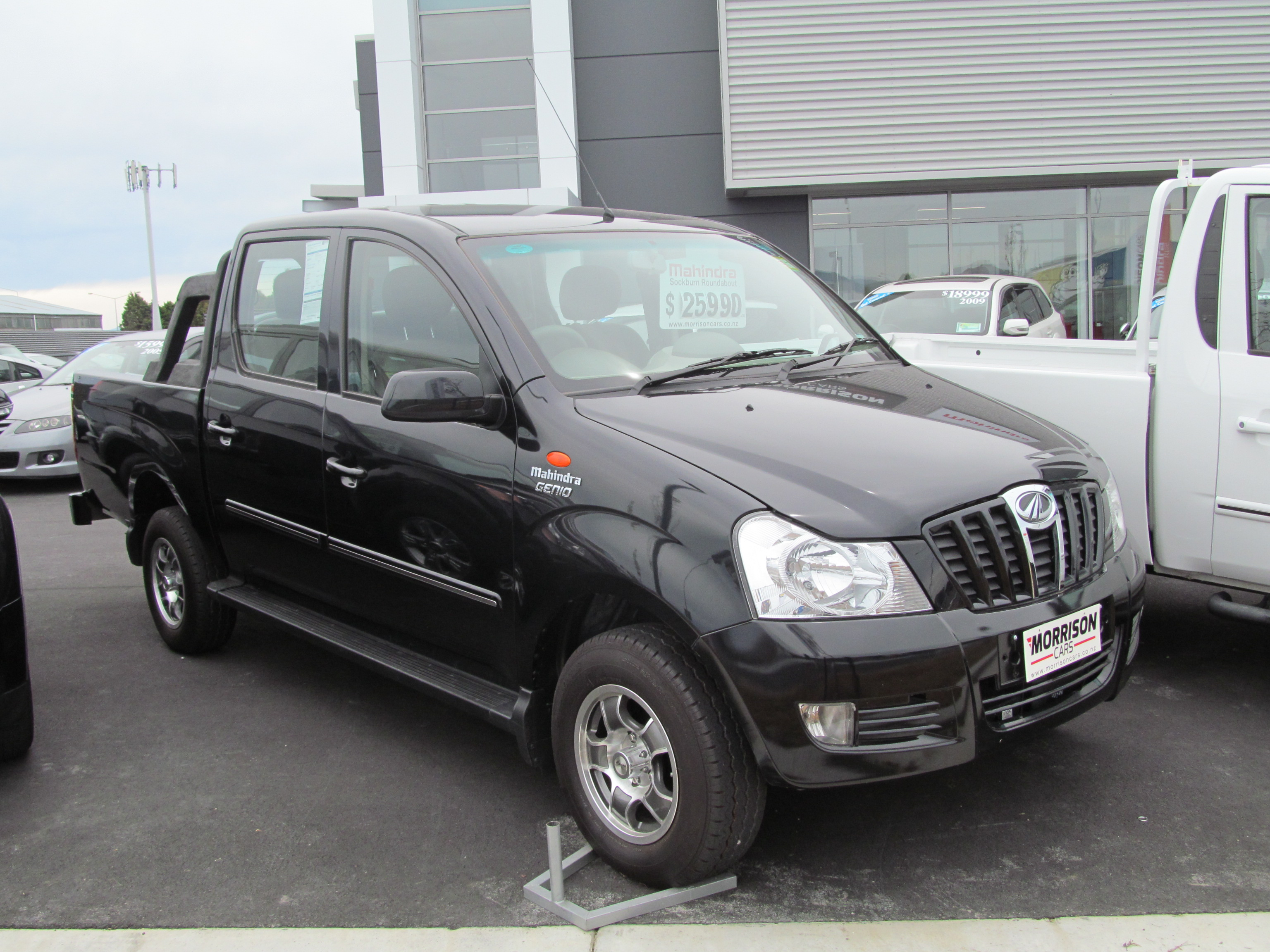
- Mahindra Genio in New Zealand

Overview
- Manufacturer: Mahindra & Mahindra Limited
- Model years: 2011–2016

Body and chassis
- Class: Mid-size pickup truck
- Body style: 2-door Single cab; 4-door Double cab
- Layout: Front-engine, rear-wheel-drive; Front engine, four-wheel-drive
- Platform: Mahindra Ingenio platform
- Related: Mahindra Xylo

Powertrain
- Engine: 2.2 L DW12 mHawk I4 diesel
- Transmission: 5-speed manual

Dimensions
- Wheelbase: 3,200 mm (126.0 in)
- Length: 5,185 mm (204.1 in)
- Width: 1,850 mm (72.8 in)
- Height: 1,890 mm (74.4 in)

Chronology
- Successor: Mahindra Imperio

The Mahindra Genio is a mid-size pickup truck manufactured by the Indian automaker Mahindra & Mahindra. It is the pickup version of the Mahindra Xylo.

On 6 January 2016, the Genio has been replaced by an updated facelifted version, known as the Mahindra Imperio.

== Engine ==
The mHawk Diesel engine holds a capacity of 2.2-liters with 4 cylinders that delivers 120 PS (88 kW; 118 hp). The mHawk employs a top-mounted intercooler to improve turbocharger efficiency. The engine is based on the Bosch Common Rail system with solenoid injectors and fuel spray design that improves fuel efficiency. The mHawk is equipped with a two chain drive stage system and hydraulic lash adjusters.

| Engine | Capacity | Power | Torque |
|---|---|---|---|
| mHawk | 2,179 cc (2.2 L) | 88 kW (118.0 hp) @4000 rpm | 280 N⋅m (206.5 lb⋅ft) @1800-2800 rpm |

== Gallery ==
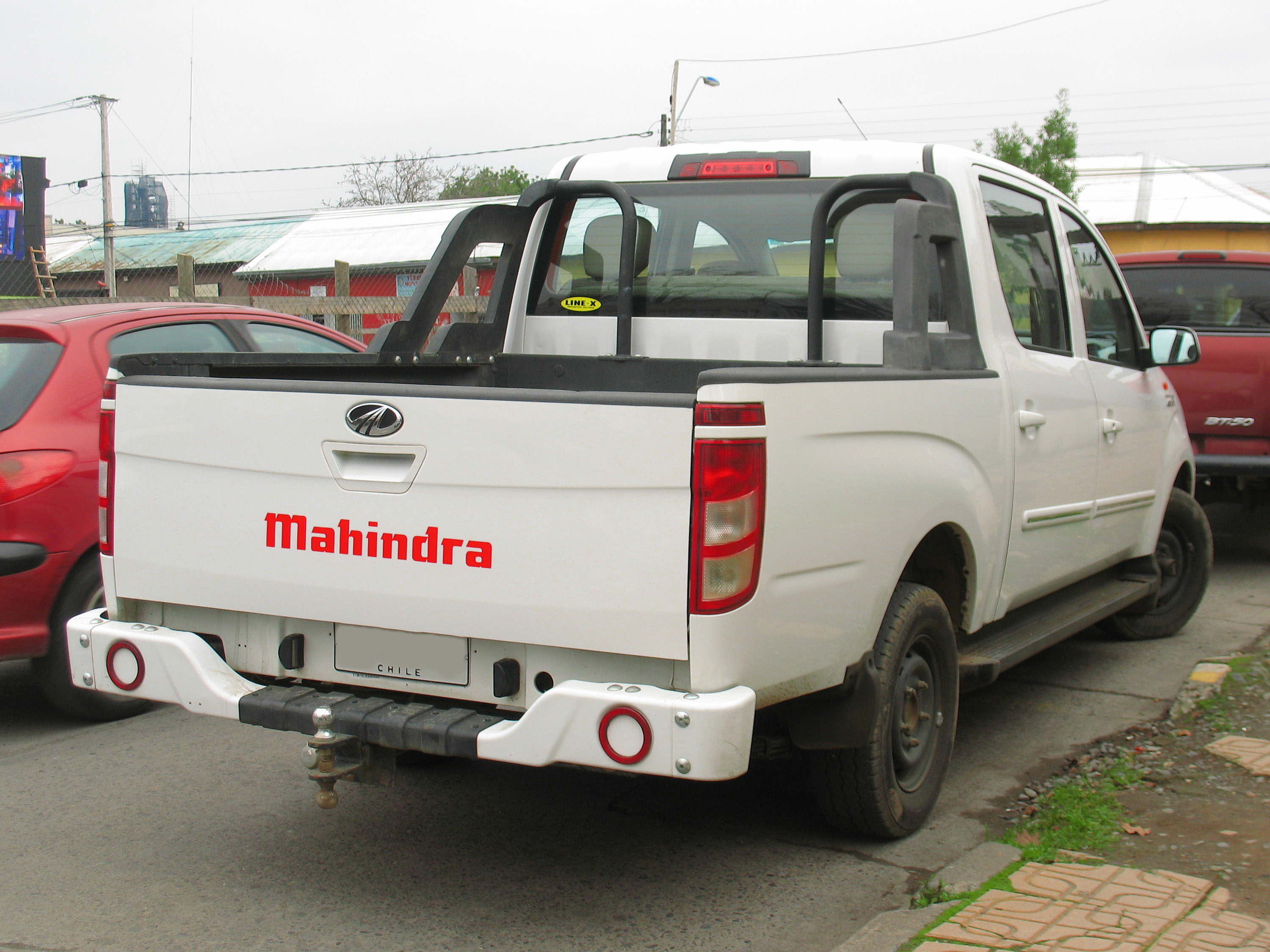
2013 Mahindra Genio
2.2 CRDe 4x4 (Chile)

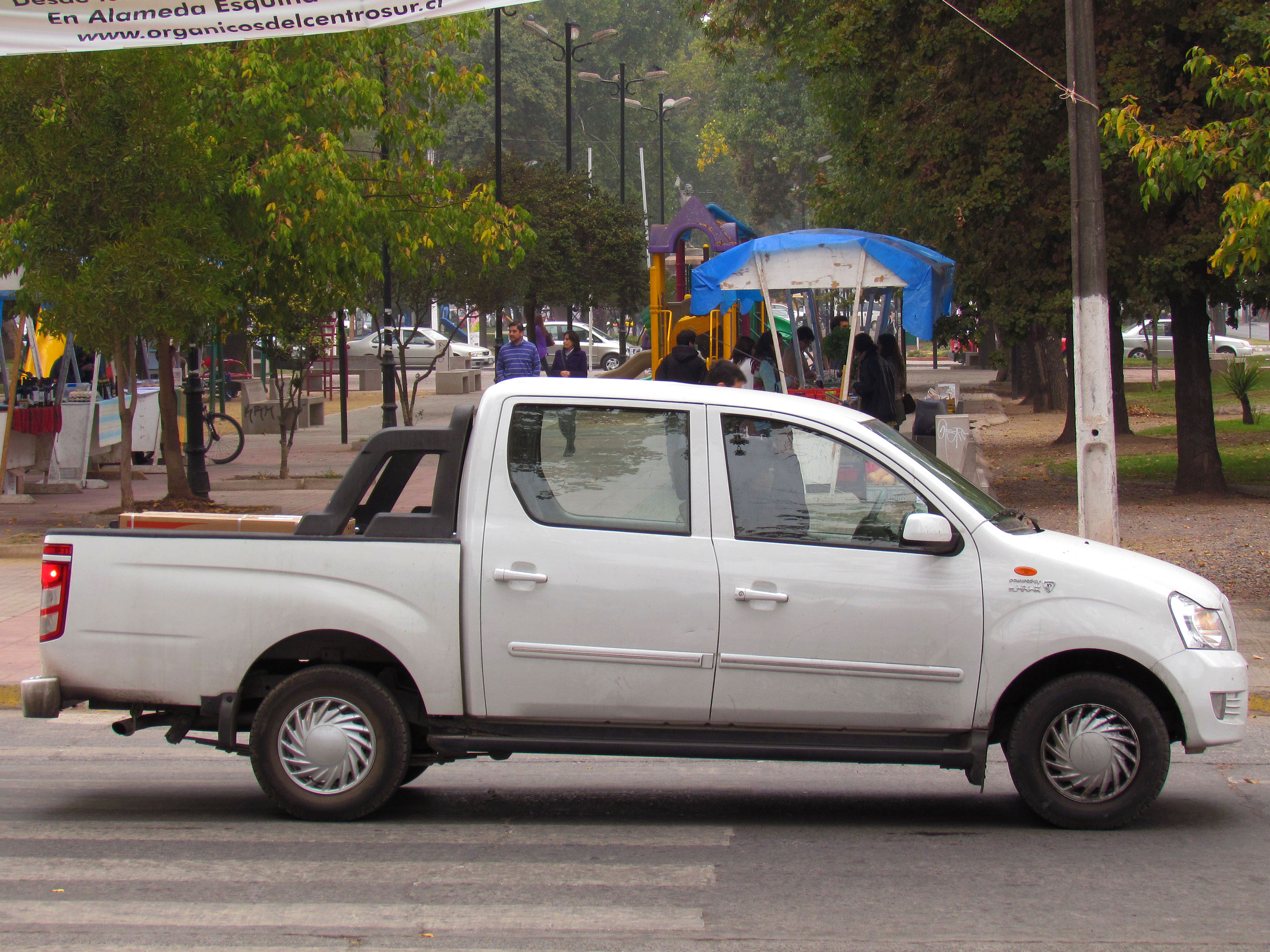
2014 Mahindra Genio
2.2 CRDe Crew-Cab (Chile)
