= Mahindra Armored Light Specialist Vehicle =

Mahindra Armoured Light Specialist Vehicle
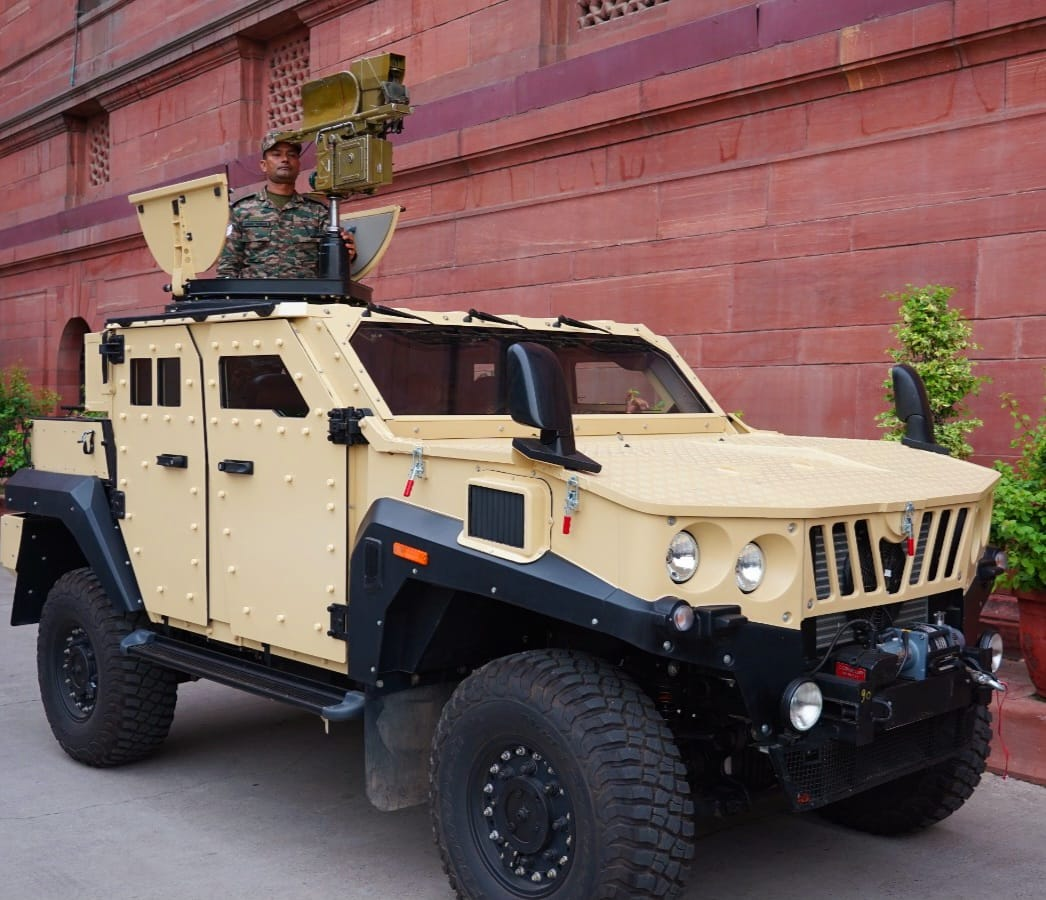
- Mahindra ALSV
- Type: Infantry mobility vehicle with MRAP capabilities
- Place of origin: India

Service history
- In service: October 2020
- Used by: Indian Army; UN peacekeeping Forces (MONUSCO)
- Wars: Insurgency in Jammu and Kashmir

Production history
- Designer: Mahindra Defence Systems
- Manufacturer: Mahindra Defence Systems
- Unit cost: 81.2 Lacs

Specifications
- Mass: 2,500 kg curb weight
- Length: 4.4 m
- Width: 1.96 m
- Height: 1.98 m
- Armor: CEN B7 STANAG Level II
- Engine: Steyr 3.2-litre 6 Cylinder Diesel Engine- Turbocharged; 215 hp @ 3600 rpm
- Payload capacity: 1,000 Kgs
- Transmission: 4 Speed Automatic
- Suspension: Bilstein Heavy Duty Suspension
- Maximum speed: 120 kph
- Steering system: Power steering, Front wheel

Mahindra Armoured Light Specialist Vehicle (ALSV), also known as Armado or simply Light Specialist Vehicle (LSV), is a light-weight four-wheel drive air transportable tactical armoured specialist vehicle designed by Mahindra & Mahindra for the Indian Army and the Indian Special Forces. It is a modular type vehicle built to be maintenance friendly, and can be upgraded and configured for wide range of roles.

== History ==
The vehicle is a derivative of Mahindra Axe. It is powered by a Steyr 3.2-litre, 6-cylinder turbodiesel engine which provides 215 hp at 3600 rpm with a peak torque of 500Nm.

In March 2021, the company won a contract to supply 1,300 Light Specialist Vehicles (LSV) worth ₹1,056 crore (equivalent to ₹12 billion or US$120 million in 2023) to the Indian Army. The deliveries of the vehicles began on 17 June 2023.

In January 2023, the Indian Army released a Request for Proposal (RFP) for the procurement of 50 automated infantry mortar systems mounted on 4×4 high-mobility light vehicles. The contract was secured by Mahindra which offered its Vehicle Mounted Infantry Mortar System (VMIMS), the mortar carrier variant of ALSV fitted with Alakran-L deployable mortar system from Milanion NTGS. The system primarily deploys an 81 mm mortar with an option for heavy 120 mm mortar as well. The contract was formalised later in 2023 and deliveries started from the same year. The variant in-service was first publicly displayed at the 75th Republic Day parade in New Delhi on 26 January 2024. On 30 January, Milanion NTGS announced that the delivery mortar system for VMIMS would be completed by late 2024. By March 2025, the system was deployed in the Sikkim region by the Trishakti Corps. The system has a marketing designation of Mahindra ALSV Alakran 81mm VMIMS and Indian Army designation of Airawat.

== Design ==
The Mahindra ALSV has been designed to comply with the Indian Army's future requirements of a Light Armored tactical vehicle. The ALSV comes in several variants - 6 or 8-seater Armoured Protection Vehicle, Light Armoured Ambulance, Command and Control Vehicle and Ammunition Carrier variants. The ALSV offers ballistic protection of STANAG Level 1 upgradeable to CEN B7 STANAG Level II; STANAG Level II could stop a range of ammunitions including 7.62×51mm NATO caliber and heavy .50 BMG rounds.

The ALSV offers ballistic protection against IEDs, hand grenades and anti personnel mines. It is ideally suited for patrolling in high intensity combat zones.

The vehicle has a Steyr 3.2-litre, 6-cylinder multi-fuel turbodiesel engine that develops 215HP at 3,600 rpm and a peak torque of 500Nm, mated to a four-speed automatic transmission. It has a load capacity of 400 kg.

The ALSV can also be integrated with Milan-2T ATGM launchers, grenade launcher and medium machine guns. The ATGM variant was tested in Teesta Field Firing Range by Indian Army's Trishakti Corps in February 2024. Future plans for the vehicle also include integrating loitering munitions.

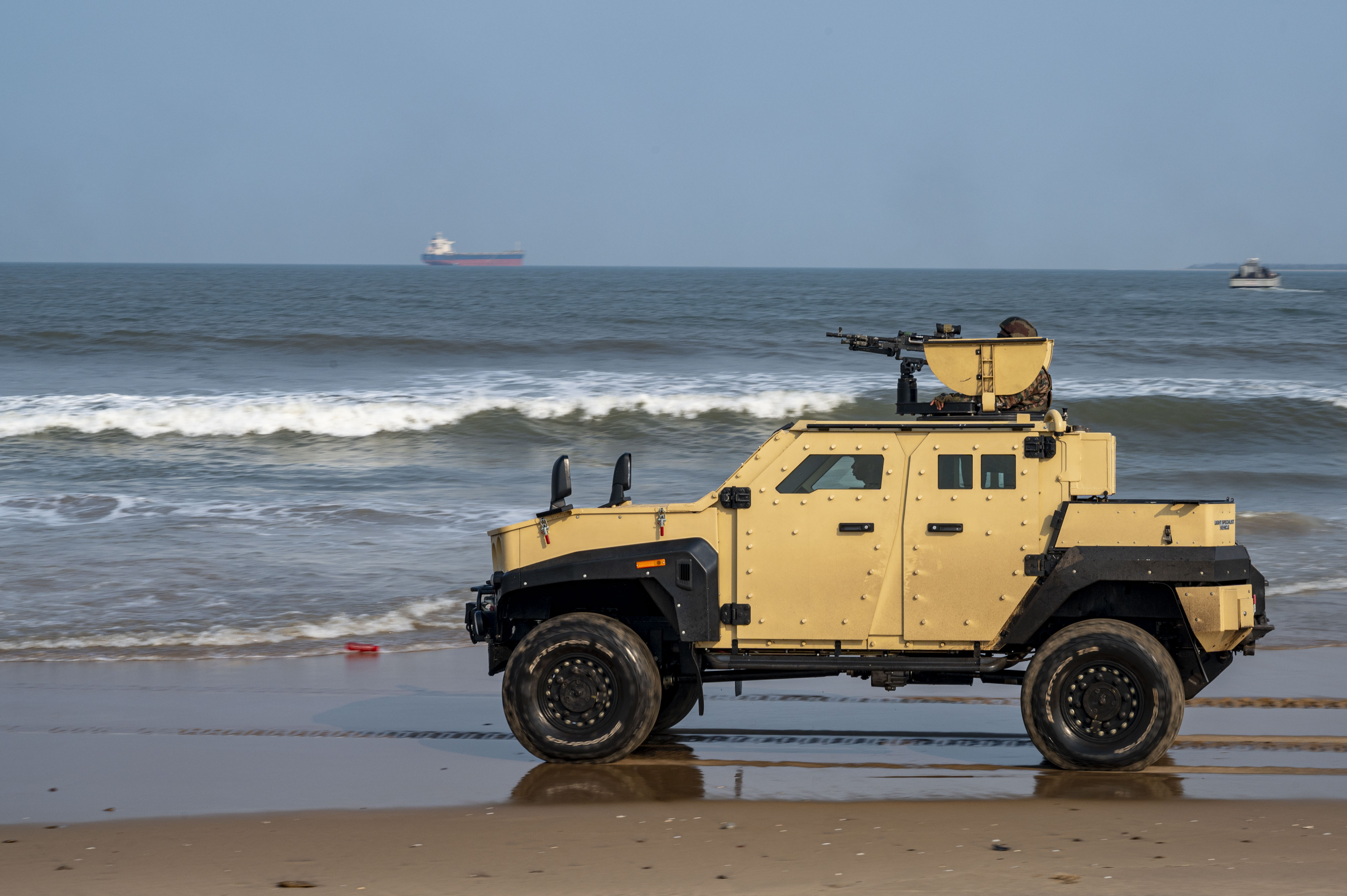
Indian Army soldiers ride in a Mahindra Armored Light Specialist Vehicle during a large-scale amphibious landing drill as part of Exercise Tiger Triumph, at Kakinada Beach, Andhra Pradesh, India, April 11, 2025

The mortar carrier variant of the ALSV, designated as Vehicle Mounted Infantry Mortar System (VMIMS), is equipped with Milanion NTGS Alakran mortar system. The calibre of mortar maybe 81 mm or 120 mm. The system is deployed from the rear of the vehicle using an electromechanical actuator. It takes two minutes for the system to fire 8 rounds towards enemy positions, making it an ideal shoot-and-scoot platform. It has a maximum firing range 7.2 km. The system, operated by a two-member crew, has a sustained firing rate of 16 per minute and a maximum rate of 20 rounds per minute. The system has a capacity of 72 mortar bombs with 36 each stored on either side of the vehicle.

== Variants ==
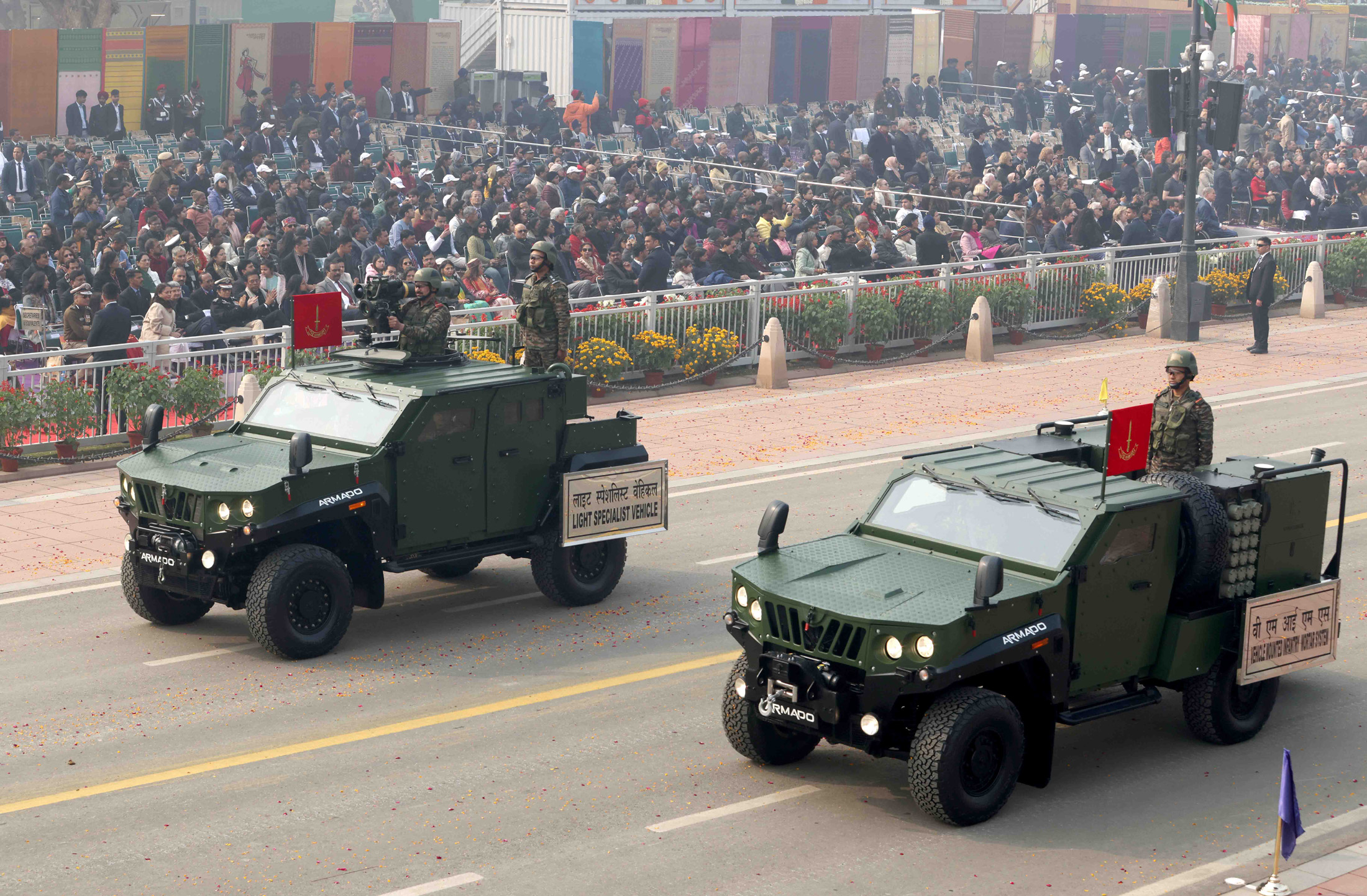
Mahindra ALSV Armado (left) and Mahindra VMIMS Airawat (right) during Republic Day Parade 2024

The variants of Mahindra ALSV includes : -

- 6 or 8-seater Armoured Protection Vehicle
- Light Armoured Ambulance
- Command and Control Vehicle
- Ammunition Carrier
- Vehicle Mounted Infantry Mortar System (VMIMS) or Airawat: Mortar carrier variant

== Operators ==
India

- Indian Army
  - 1,300 Armado LSV infantry mobility vehicles operational and deployed in Kashmir and Sikkim (Trishakti Corps) region.
  - 50 Airawat VMIMS mortar carriers operational and deployed Sikkim (Trishakti Corps) region.

United Nations

- UN Peacekeeping Forces (MONUSCO) – unknown number in active service
