= Mahindra Lifespaces =

Indian real estate and infrastructure development company

Mahindra Lifespace Developers Limited
- Type: Public
- Traded as: BSE: 532313, NSE: MAHLIFE
- Founded: 1994
- Headquarters: Mumbai, India
- Key people: Amit Kumar Sinha (MD & CEO); Arun Nanda (Chairman)
- Revenue: ▲₹1,266 crore (US$130 million) (total income, FY2026)
- Operating income: ▼₹−110 crore (US$−11 million)(2023)
- Net income: ▲₹298 crore (US$31 million) (FY2026)
- Total assets: ▲₹3,610 crore (US$370 million) (2023)
- Total equity: ▲₹1,805 crore (US$190 million) (2023)
- Number of employees: 300+ (2021)
- Parent: Mahindra & Mahindra
- Website: mahindralifespaces.com

Mahindra Lifespace Developers Ltd. is an Indian real estate and infrastructure development company headquartered in Mumbai, India. The company was founded in 1994 and is part of the Mahindra Group. The company focuses on residential developments and integrated cities and industrial clusters across various locations in India including Mumbai, Pune, Nagpur, Ahmedabad, Delhi NCR, Jaipur, Hyderabad, Chennai, and Bengaluru.

== History ==
GESCO Corporation Limited was incorporated as a Private Limited Company on 16 March 1999 which was converted to a Public Limited Company on 18 August 1999. GESCO was originally the real estate division of Great Eastern Shipping and was spun off into an independent company in April 1999. In 2001, GESCO Corporation and Mahindra Realty & Infrastructure Developers Ltd (MRIDL) demerged the realty and infrastructure divisions of MRIDL and merged it into GESCO. In 2007, the Company name was changed from Mahindra GESCO Developers Limited to Mahindra Lifespace Developers Ltd. (MLDL)

Sangeeta Prasad, managing director and chief executive officer since October 2018, resigned in February 2020 to pursue other interests, with effect from 30 June 2020. She was succeeded from 1 July 2020 by Arvind Subramanian, previously chief executive of Mahindra Happinest, the company's affordable housing business. Subramanian resigned for personal reasons, effective 22 May 2023, and Amit Kumar Sinha was appointed to the role from 23 May 2023. In February 2025, the company's board approved raising up to ₹1,500 crore (US$160 million) through a rights issue to reduce debt and fund growth. In the 2025–26 financial year, its sales bookings rose 21 percent to ₹3,405 crore (US$350 million), and its net profit rose to ₹298.17 crore (US$31 million) from ₹61.35 crore (US$6.4 million) the previous year.

== Awards and recognition ==
2016: Porter Prize For Excellence In Governance by India's National Competitiveness Forum (NCF)

== Initiatives ==
=== The Mahindra Teri Centre of Excellence ===
In 2016, the company and The Energy and Resources Institute (TERI) agreed to establish the Mahindra-TERI Centre of Excellence for Sustainable Habitats at TERI's Gual Pahari campus near Gurgaon. The centre was set up to research energy and water efficiency, low-cost green materials and building technologies suited to Indian residential buildings.

=== Sustainable Leadership Housing Coalition ===
MLDL is one of the founding members of the Sustainable Housing Leadership Consortium (SHLC), a private sector-led consortium founded in 2016.

=== Mahindra World City Jaipur ===
MWC Jaipur is a joint venture between Mahindra Lifespace Developers Ltd (MLDL) and Rajasthan State Industrial Development and Investment Corporation (RIICO). In 2015, MWCJ became the first project in Asia to receive Stage 2 Climate Positive Development certification from the C40 Cities Climate Leadership Group (C40).
