= Mahindra Xylo =

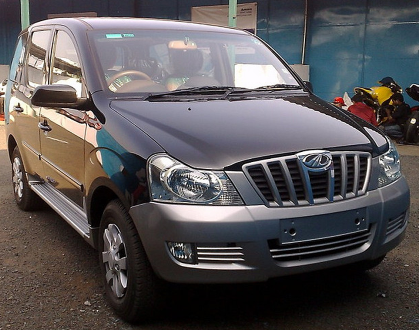

Overview
- Manufacturer: Mahindra & Mahindra Limited
- Production: 2009–2019
- Assembly: Nashik, Maharashtra, India

Body and chassis
- Class: Compact MPV
- Body style: 5-door wagon
- Layout: Front-engine, RWD
- Platform: Mahindra Ingenio platform
- Related: Mahindra Scorpio; Mahindra Quanto; Mahindra Genio

Powertrain
- Engine: 2.2L DW12 mHawk I4 diesel 2.5L XD3TE CRDe I4 diesel
- Transmission: 5-speed manual

Dimensions
- Wheelbase: 2,760 mm (109 in)
- Length: 4,520 mm (178 in)
- Width: 1,850 mm (73 in)
- Height: 1,895 mm (75 in)

Chronology
- Successor: Mahindra Marazzo

The Mahindra Xylo is a compact MPV designed and manufactured by the Indian automobile manufacturer Mahindra & Mahindra from 2009 to 2019.

== History ==
=== Development ===
The project of the vehicle, codenamed "Ingenio", was first announced by Mahindra in 2006 and was designed to compete in the Indian market with the Toyota Innova and the Chevrolet Tavera. The project cost the company around Rs 550 crore. Production began at Mahindra's Nashik plant in December 2008.

=== Pre-facelift (2009–2012) ===
The Xylo was launched in India on 13 January 2009, with sales started in March 2009. Prior to its launch, more than 3,000 units were sold in the first full month. However, since then, sales have slowly declined, it is widely believed that the sales have not lived up to Mahindra's expectations. The Xylo was loosely based on the ladder frame platform from the Mahindra Scorpio. The chassis was modified in order to take account of the Xylo's longer wheelbase and higher refinement requirements. It is available with a number of seating configurations, including a 8-seater with two up front and two benches, or a 7-seater with two up front, middle-row captain seats and a rear bench. For safety features, some trim levels may come standard with dual front airbags and ABS with EBD.

Originally, the Xylo was also rumored to have four-wheel-drive models, various test mules have been spotted on undergoing trials. However, none of the four-wheel-drive Xylos were ever being brought to the market. It might be likely due to the company's fears of cannibalization to the sales of the Mahindra Scorpio, as well to a reluctance to invest further in development costs of an underperforming model.

=== Facelift (2012–2019) ===
The Mahindra Xylo was comprehensively updated in 2012, featuring new transmissions and a modern 2.2-litre mHawk turbo-diesel engine for higher trim levels. Other changes includes a revised suspension tuning, a restyled front fascia, smoked rear taillights, blacked out window pillars, and leather interiors for the top-of-the-line H9 model. In June 2012, sales have crossed the mark of 100,000 units. The Xylo received some minor cosmetic changes again in late 2013, including side body decals and a bonnet chrome strip. As of January 2015, it is offered in five trim levels: D2, D4, H6, H8 and H9.

In addition to India, the Xylo was also sold in some selected international markets, including South Africa, Colombia, and a few various parts of Southern Asian and North African countries. It is rumored that the production of the Xylo might end in 2018, but Mahindra decides that they would keep the production of the Xylo until further notice. In June 2019, Mahindra announced that the Xylo will be discontinued due to the stricter crash safety and BS-VI emission standards, that would take place in March 2020. The Xylo will be eventually replaced by the Mahindra Marazzo.

== Specifications ==
Dimensions
Length: 4520 mm Width: 1850 mm Height: 1905 mm
Wheelbase: 2760 mm Turning Radius: 5.5 m Ground Clearance: 186 mm
Boot Space: - Fuel Capacity: 55 L Seating Capacity: 7-8
Performance
Displacement: 2179 cc
Peak Power: 122 BHP @4000 RPM
Peak Torque: 280 NM@2400 RPM
