= Rajesh Jejurikar =

Indian businessman and executive

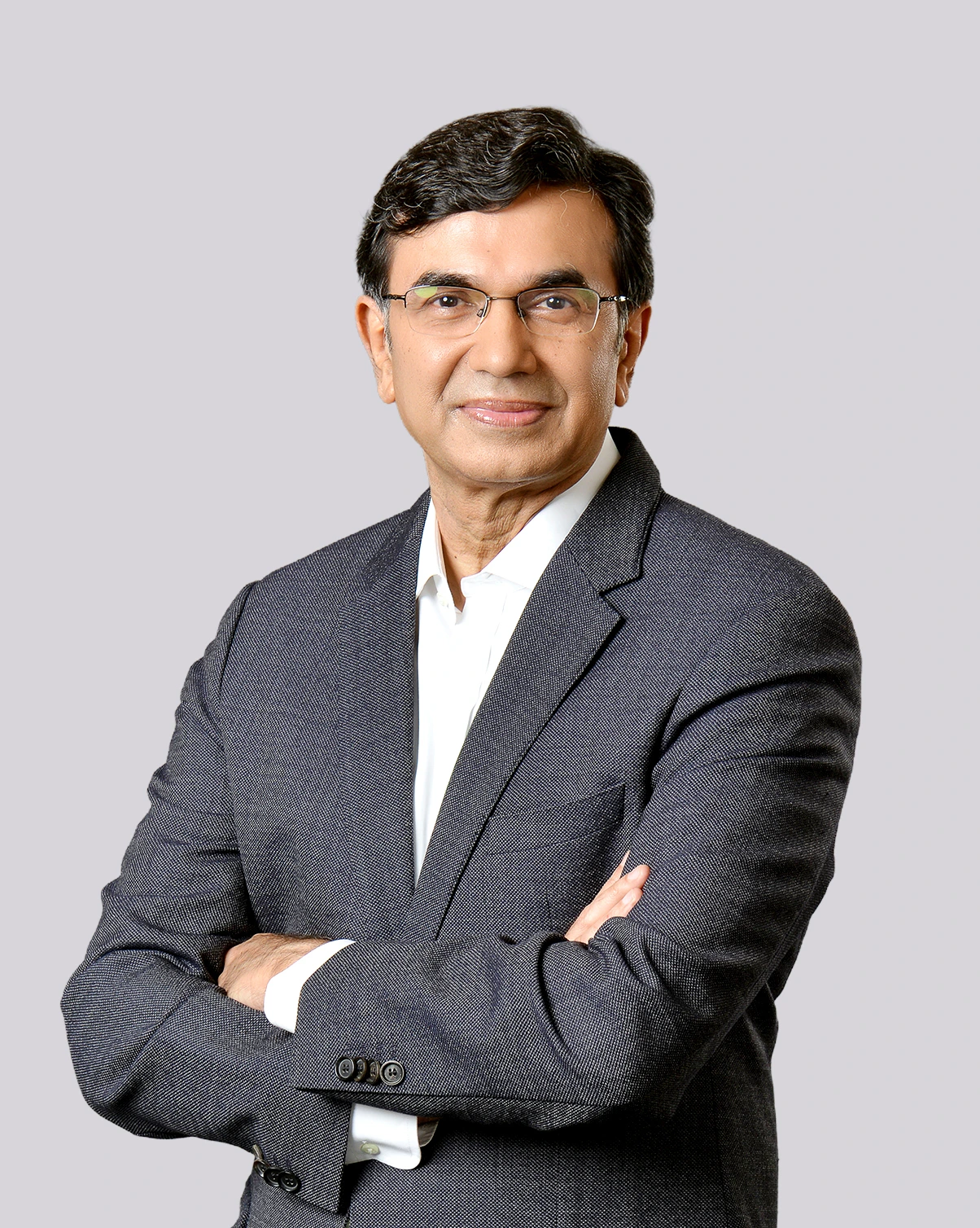
- Born: 24 June 1964 (age 62); Mumbai, Maharashtra, India
- Education: Mumbai University (B.A.); SPJIMR (MBA)
- Occupation: Businessman
- Known for: Managing Director within Mahindra Group
- Relatives: Shailesh Jejurikar (brother)

Rajesh Jejurikar (born 24 June 1964) is an Indian executive and businessman who is serving as the executive director and CEO (Auto & Farm Sectors) of Mahindra & Mahindra Ltd, an Indian multinational automobile manufacturing corporation headquartered in Mumbai. He is also a member of the company's board of directors and serves on the boards of several other Mahindra Group entities in India and abroad.

== Early life and education ==
Rajesh was born on 24 June 1964 in Mumbai, India. He completed his bachelor's degree in Economics and Statistics from the Mumbai University. He then completed his MBA from the S. P. Jain Institute of Management and Research in 1986. In 2003, he was awarded the British Chevening Scholarship to study at Manchester Business School in the UK. He also completed the Advanced Management Program at the Wharton School, University of Pennsylvania, in 2007.

== Career ==
He began his career with Voltas (1986–1990), followed by roles at FCB Ulka (1990–1991) and Marico Ltd. (1991–2000). He joined Mahindra & Mahindra Ltd. in 2000 as Vice President (Marketing) for the Automotive Sector, where he was part of the team that launched the Bolero and Scorpio SUVs. In 2003, he was promoted to Executive Vice President (Sales & Marketing). In 2008, he was appointed Chief of Operations for the Automotive Sector, and in 2010, became Chief Executive of the Automotive Division and a member of the Group Executive Board. During this time, the XUV500 was launched under his leadership.

In 2012, he briefly moved to Zee Entertainment Enterprises Ltd as president.

He returned to Mahindra in February 2013 as Chief Executive- Tractor & Farm Mechanisation for the Farm Equipment Sector (FES). Under his leadership, Mahindra expanded its global presence to markets such as the US and Turkey.

In 2020, he was appointed executive director and CEO (Auto and Farm Sector). Since then, Mahindra has launched many models (like XUV700, Thar, Scorpio N, XUV700, XUV 3XO) and Electric SUVs during his tenure.

== Personal life ==
He has a younger brother named Shailesh Jejurikar who is currently the CEO of Procter & Gamble an American multinational consumer goods corporation.

== Other Boards and Committees ==
- Director on the Boards of Mahindra & Mahindra Ltd, Mahindra Electric Automobile Ltd
- Member of the Governing Council of S.P. Jain Institute of Management and Research
- Past President, Tractor Manufacturers Association (TMA)

== Honours and awards ==
- CEO of the Year - Forbes India Leadership Awards (FILA), 2025
- Business Leader of the Year - Car & Bike Awards, 2024
- Indian Global Automotive Leader of the Year - BBC Top Gear Awards, 2024
- Distinguished Alumnus Award - S.P. Jain Institute of Management and Research, 2023
- Autocar Professional's Man of the Year 2022
