= Mahindra Marazzo =

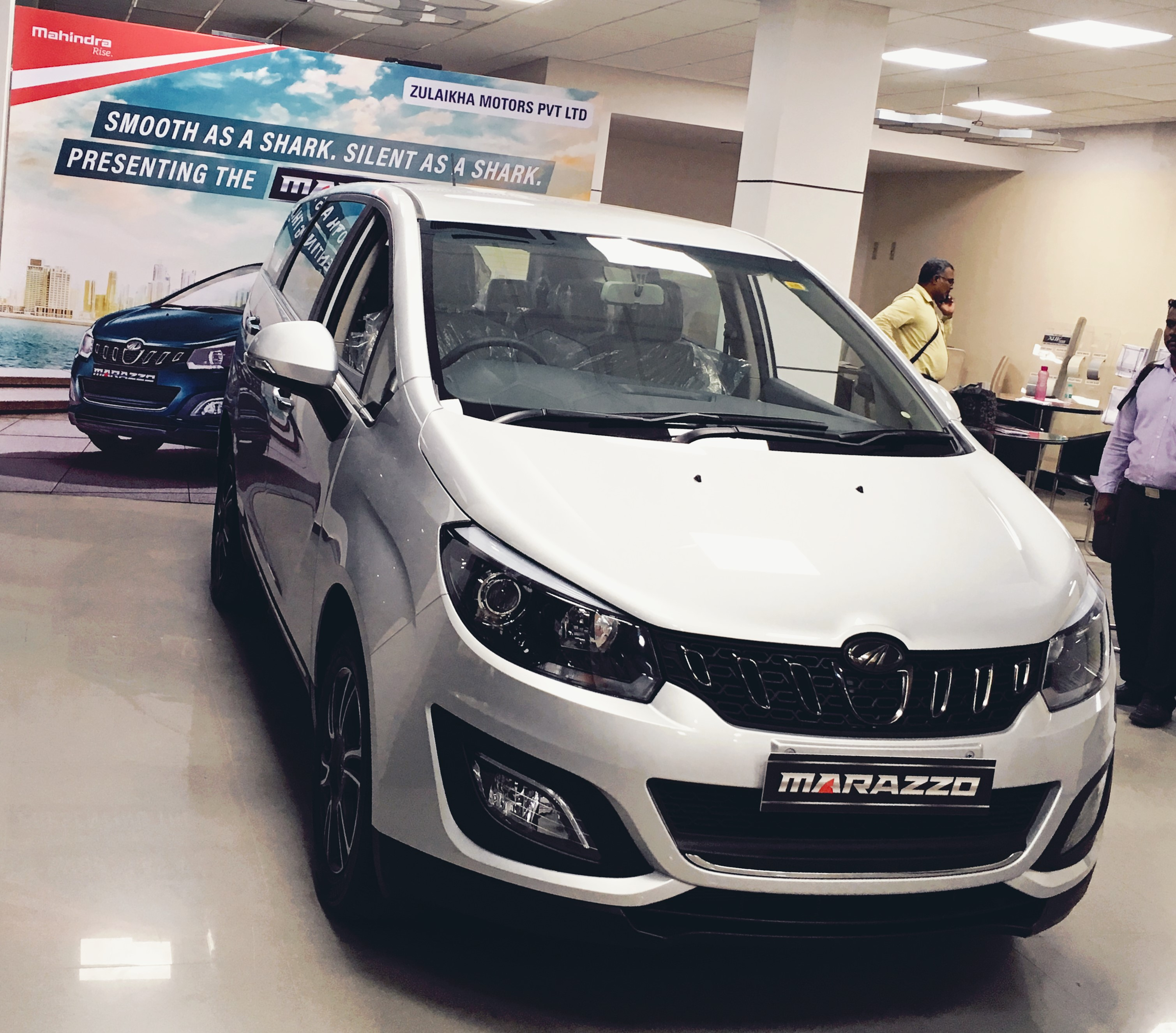

Overview
- Manufacturer: Mahindra & Mahindra Limited
- Production: 2018–2024
- Designer: Mahindra Design Studio; Pininfarina

Body and chassis
- Class: Compact MPV
- Body style: 5-door wagon

Powertrain
- Engine: 1.5 L 4D15 I4 (diesel)
- Transmission: 6-speed Manual

Dimensions
- Wheelbase: 2,760 mm (109 in)
- Length: 4,585 mm (181 in)
- Width: 1,866 mm (73 in)
- Height: 1,774 mm (70 in)

Chronology
- Predecessor: Mahindra Xylo

The Mahindra Marazzo is a compact multi-purpose vehicle (MPV) manufactured by Mahindra & Mahindra since 2018.

The Marazzo was exhibited at the 2019 North American International Auto Show alongside the Roxor.

== Design ==
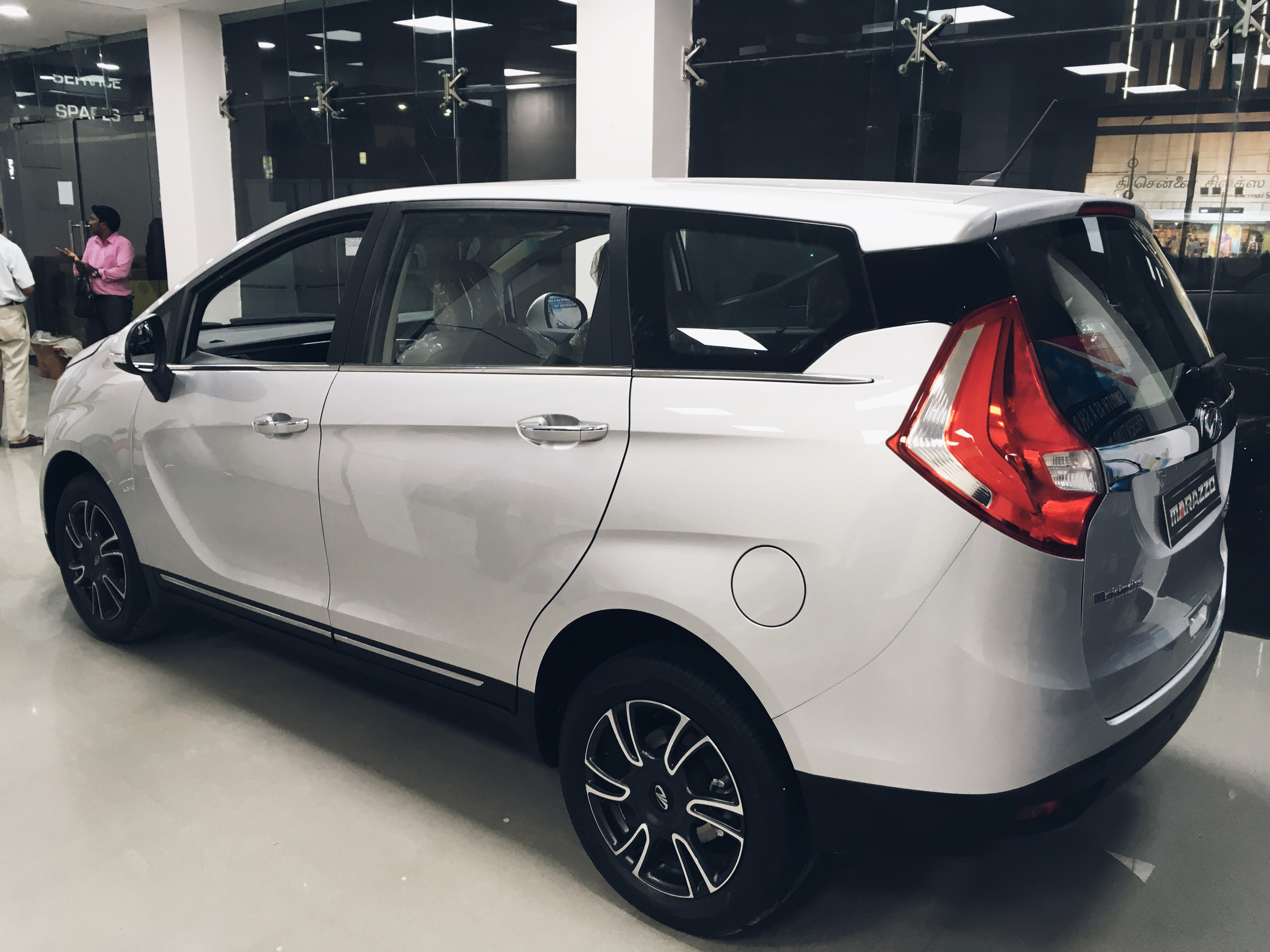
Mahindra Marazzo rear

The Marazzo was designed and developed by Mahindra's Design Studio, partnering with Pininfarina, Mahindra Research Valley, Chennai and Mahindra Automotive North America, Troy, Michigan in the initial stages and product engineering. The initial project code name was U321. The Marazzo was launched on September 3, 2018 and it is available either a 7-seater with captain seats in the middle row or an 8-seater. The climate control for the rear passengers is mounted on the center roof with a diffuse throw option for reduced noise.

=== Engine ===
The Marazzo is powered by a BS6 compliant 4D15 1.5-litre four cylinder diesel engine that delivers a 123 PS (121 bhp; 90 kW) and 300 N⋅m (221 lb⋅ft) of torque. Only manual transmission is being offered. A petrol version, along with an automatic transmission were expected to be launched in 2022-23.

== Safety ==
Global NCAP 1.0 test results (India) Mahindra Marazzo (*) – 2 Airbags (2018, similar to Latin NCAP 2013)
Test	Score	Stars
Adult occupant protection	12.85/17.00	4 /5 stars
Child occupant protection	22.22/49.00	2 /5 stars

Marazzo received a four star rating for adult occupants and 2 stars for infants from the Global NCAP 1.0 in 2018 (similar to Latin NCAP 2013).
