= Gamaya =

Software company

- Industry: Farming technology
- Founded: 2015
- Founder: Dragos Constantin, Igor Ivanov and Yosef Akhtman
- Headquarters: Morges, Switzerland
- Key people: Igor Ivanov (CEO)
- Services: Hyperspectral cameras, precision farming
- Website: www.gamaya.com

Gamaya is a Swiss company which provides drones equipped with hyper-spectral cameras for use in agriculture.

The company has 35 employees and is located in Morges, Switzerland. Igor Ivanov is the current company CEO.

== History ==
Gamaya was founded in 2015 as an EPFL laboratory spinoff by Dragos Constantin, Igor Ivanov and Yosef Akhtman.

In 2016, the company raised $3.2 million from the Sandoz Family Foundation, Peter Brabeck-Letmathe, Seed4Equity, and VI Partners.

In 2017, Gamaya received the Swiss Economic Forum Hightech award as well as the Nvidia Inception award.

In 2019, the company raised another CHF 12 million, led by Mahindra & Mahindra.

== Hyperspectral camera technology ==
Gamaya's hyperspectral camera technology was developed between 2013 and 2015 through the EPFL Leman-Baikal project. It captures 40 bands of light. Hyperspectral images shot with a drone are then used to generate a survey of the land. The data can be used for detecting invasive species and crop diseases, predicting yields, or for optimising soil treatment and fertilisation.

Gamaya's cameras have been used in scientific studies as part of data collection for hyperspectral survey of agricultural crops.
