= Madan Padaki =

Entrepreneur and business executive

- Born: 1973 (age 52–53); India
- Education: S. P. Jain Institute of Management and Research
- Occupations: Business executive and entrepreneur
- Known for: Co-founder and director of education management company Sylvant Advisors
- Spouse: Roopa Padaki
- Children: 1 (Varun)

Madan Padaki is an Indian entrepreneur and business executive. He is the co-founder and director of Sylvant Advisors focused on the field of education management. He is also CEO and MD of Head Held High Services, a social enterprise for rural youth, and former co-founder of MeritTrac Services, a skill assessment and testing company.

In 2011, he was conferred The Young Education Leader Award by EDGE Forum – a forum of leading educationists and educational institutions in India.

He serves as a senior advisor to Tata Trusts, serves on the Governing Council of TiE Bangalore, Indo-American Chamber of Commerce, Karnataka and also serves on the Governing Council of DOEACC, an organisation of the Ministry of IT, Govt. of India to evaluate IT education in India.

== Early life and education ==
Padaki was born in India in 1973 and earned an engineering degree from the National Institute of Engineering (NIE), University of Mysore, and an MBA from S. P. Jain Institute of Management and Research (SPJIMR), Mumbai.

== Career ==
Padaki's first entrepreneurial venture was in 2000, when he co-founded MeritTrac, a skill assessment and training company. Manipal Education Group (MEG) bought a 70% stake in MeritTrac in which he along with his founding team continue to lead MeritTrac as an independent entity. In 2011, he transitioned to Manipal Education from MeritTrac to head up Strategy, Innovation and International Partnerships before moving out in 2013. MeritTrac is today India's Largest Skills Assessment company and is recognized as a thought-leader in the sector, having won several awards like the NASSCOM Innovation Award and Deloitte's Fast 50 India Award. MeritTrac has also been featured extensively in several books on Entrepreneurship and is also a case-study at INSEAD.

Before co-founding MeritTrac, Padaki had stints with Wipro Corporation, Infosys Technologies and BFL Software (now EDS Mphasis). At Wipro he was attached to the Fluid Power unit in export sales and was into a product management and marketing role at Infosys. His stint at BFL Software involved a business development role and he was posted to Tokyo in a role that involved setting up their operations in the Far East.

He was also the CEO of Erudient, a global education management company. Erudient is now active in North America, Europe, Australia and Asia Pacific with clients across these geographies and operates out of offices in New York and Singapore.

=== Head Held High Services ===
Head Held High is a social enterprise which focuses on the development of rural entrepreneurial ecosystem. He started as a mentor and investor in 2009 as the co-founder and trustee of the Head Held High Foundation. Since 2013 he has taken the position of CEO and MD of the Head Held High Services Pvt. Ltd. based in Bengaluru. The company takes the uneducated youth under their wing and puts them through a rigorous 12-month training turning them into white-collar Business process outsourcing (BPO) employees servicing multinational corporations. This innovative approach to skill rural youth is termed as ‘RubanShakti’.

The company has also developed RubanBridge, Head Held High Services’ business transaction platform that brings in various market players to engage with business opportunities in rural India in a structured manner, across various sectors including agriculture, healthcare, education, energy, water and sanitation, transport and communication.

Padaki has also coined a term – rubanomics, a combination of rural plus urban and economics. He has also given a TEDx talk – Eradicating Rural Poverty which elaborates on the idea of Rubanomics and its impact as a movement. The movement has won several awards, including the CNN IBN Real Heroes Award, 2011, Global Sourcing Council Award 2011.

In August 2013, the company raised the first round of investment of Rs 2.5 crore from angel investors in India and abroad who are focused on impact investments. The investors include UTV founder (Ronnie Screwvala) led Unilazer Ventures, five Angels from the Intellecap Impact Investment Network (I3N), including Pravin Gandhi, Jayesh Parekh, Reena Mithal and Sanjeev Shah, and US-based investors like Kartik Kilachand.

=== Sylvant Advisors ===
Sylvant is co-founded by Anand Sudarshan (former CEO of Manipal Global Education), Madan Padaki (former CEO MeritTrac, co-founder Head Held High Services) and PV Boccasam (serial entrepreneur, General Partner at NovakBiddle Venture Partners, US). Sylvant works with education entrepreneurs to accelerate their growth - beginning with drafting business strategies, early-stage seed investments, aiding in larger fund-raising effort, providing operational support and being a part of an entire growth journey. Sylvant currently has a portfolio of 14 education startups including GuruG, Lodestar, LabInApp, Entlogics.
