= Mahindra Axe =

Mahindra AXE
- Type: Military 4x4
- Place of origin: India

Service history
- In service: Prototype
- Used by: Indian Army

Production history
- Manufacturer: Mahindra & Mahindra Limited

Specifications
- Mass: 2,500 kg curb weight
- Length: 4.4 m
- Width: 1.96 m
- Height: 1.98 m
- Engine: 4 cyl Diesel; 140 hp (100 kW)
- Transmission: 5-gear automatic from Mercedes-Benz
- Suspension: Independent

The Mahindra Axe is a Light Military Utility Tactical Vehicle designed by Mahindra & Mahindra. Prototypes of the vehicle were customized to meet Indian Army specifications, but after evaluating the vehicles the Indian Army decided not to place an order.

The vehicle was meant to be marketed to the Indian Army and special forces units.

== Design ==
Axe is built on a new platform, derived from existing Mahindra models. According to Brigadier Khutub A Hai, CEO, Mahindra Defence Systems, "The Axe was designed with help from an overseas designer".

Current Axe variants use either a diesel engine (a 2.7 L Mercedes derived Ssangyong engine, which powers the Rexton) or a petrol engine (using 4 L GM Vortec engine, which powers the Chevrolet TrailBlazer).

=== Fuel efficiency ===
According to Mahindra, the diesel Axe offers around 8 to 9 km/L (11.1 to 12.5 L/100 km) while the petrol Axe offers 6 to 7 km/L (14.3 to 16.6 L/100 km).

== Variants ==
Mahindra planned to launch a civilian version of the Axe, but a civilian launch is now very much in doubt.

== See also ==
- Mahindra Armored Light Specialist Vehicle
