= Mahindra & Mahindra Financial Services =

Indian financial services company

Mahindra & Mahindra Financial Services Limited
- Trade name: Mahindra Finance
- Type: Public
- Traded as: NSE: M&MFIN; BSE: 532720
- ISIN: INE774D01024
- Industry: Financial services
- Founded: 1991
- Headquarters: Mumbai, Maharashtra, India
- Area served: India
- Key people: Raul Rebello (Vice Chairman & President)
- Products: Loans, mortgage loans, insurance, mutual funds, risk management
- Revenue: ▲₹15,970 crore (US$1.7 billion) (2024)
- Operating income: ▼₹2,532 crore (US$260 million) (2024)
- Net income: ▼₹1,943 crore (US$200 million) (2024)
- Total assets: ▲₹123,716 crore (US$13 billion) (2024)
- Total equity: ▲₹19,975 crore (US$2.1 billion) (2024)
- Number of employees: 19,000+ (2021)
- Parent: Mahindra Group
- Subsidiaries: Mahindra Insurance Brokers Limited; Mahindra Rural Housing Finance; Mahindra Asset Management Company
- Website: https://mahindrafinance.com/

Mahindra & Mahindra Financial Services Limited (MMFSL) is an Indian rural non-banking financial company headquartered in Mumbai. It is amongst the top tractor financers in India, with 1000+ offices across the country.

== History ==
Mahindra Finance started on 1 January 1991, as Maxi Motors Financial Services Limited. It received the certificate of commencement of business on 19 February 1991. On 3 November 1992, Mahindra Finance changed their name to Mahindra & Mahindra Financial Services Limited. Mahindra Finance is registered with the Reserve Bank of India as an asset finance, deposit taking NBFC.

In 1993, it commenced financing M&M utility vehicles, and in 1995 started its first branch outside Mumbai, in Jaipur. The company began financing non-M&M vehicles in 2002 and got into the business of financing commercial vehicles and construction equipment in 2009. In 2011, they had a joint venture with a Rabobank subsidiary for tractor financing in the US and consolidated the product portfolio by introducing small and medium enterprises (SME) financing.

== Corporate affairs ==
As of November 2018, Ramesh Iyer is the Vice Chairman and President of Mahindra Financial Service Sector.

== Products and services ==
=== Vehicle financing ===
Vehicle financing includes auto and utility vehicles, tractors, cars, commercial vehicles and construction equipment.

Pre-owned vehicle financing includes loans for used cars, multi-utility vehicles, tractors and commercial vehicles.

=== SME financing ===
Loans are offered for varied purposes like project finance, equipment finance and working capital finance.

=== Housing finance ===
MMFSL finances the rural and semi-urban population to build houses.

=== Insurance broking ===
The company offers insurance to retail customers as well as corporations through its subsidiary Mahindra Insurance Brokers Limited.

=== Asset management company (mutual fund) ===
Launched in June 2016, the company offers mutual fund products, whose NAV is around ₹1000. The MAMC started with an AUM of ₹120 crore.

=== Mutual fund distribution ===
MMFSL advises clients on investing money under the brand Mahindra Finance Finsmart

== Subsidiaries ==
=== Mahindra Mutual Fund ===
Mahindra Asset Management Company Private Limited is a wholly owned subsidiary of Mahindra and Mahindra Financial Services Limited (MMFSL).

Mahindra AMC Pvt Ltd is the Investment Manager for Mahindra Mutual Fund. It started its operation in July 2016, with an AUM of ₹120 crore. Currently, its NAV is floating around ₹1000.

Mahindra Mutual Fund endeavors to offer a variety of mutual fund schemes pan India, with special focus in rural and semi-urban areas.

=== Mahindra Insurance Brokers Limited ===
In FY 2012–13, the insurance broking subsidiary, Mahindra Insurance Brokers Limited (MIBL) crossed the 8,00,000 mark in terms of the policies served. The company's total policies, at the end of 2012–13, stood at 8,39,408 for both life and non-life retail business lines. It reached a total of ₹600 crore gross premium. The income increased by 85 per cent from ₹46.6 crore in 2011–12 to ₹86.3 crore in 2012–13. During the year, MIBL entered into a strategic partnership with LeapFrog Investments, world's largest investor in insurance for the underserved. Through its subsidiary company, Inclusion Resources Private Limited, LeapFrog invested ₹80.4 crore for a 15% shareholding in MIBL. PayBima is the digital arm of Mahindra Insurance Brokers Ltd and was launched to help customers compare and buy insurance policies online through their website.

=== Mahindra Rural Housing Finance Limited ===
In FY 2012–13, Mahindra Rural Housing Finance Limited (MRHFL) disbursed loans aggregating to ₹432.9 crore, up from ₹266.8 crore in the previous year. The profit after tax for 2012-13 stood at ₹222.3 crore against ₹11.9 crore in the previous year. The outstanding loan portfolio, as on 31 March 2013, stood at ₹879.5 crore.

=== Mahindra Business and Consulting Services Private Limited ===
Mahindra Finance's wholly owned subsidiary, Mahindra Business & Consulting Services Private Limited (MBCSPL), provides staffing services primarily to Mahindra Finance. It also serves the subsidiaries (MIBL and MRHFL) and the parent company (Mahindra & Mahindra Limited). During the year, MBCSPL deputed 8,098 employees to these companies. The profit after tax increased from ₹7.1 lakh in 2011–12 to ₹173.8 lakh in 2012–13.

== Operations ==
Mahindra Finance primary focuses on providing financial services in rural and semi-urban markets in India. As of 2026, the company reports assets under management (AUM) exceeding US$14.1 billion, serving over 11 million customers across 8,000 towns and 16,000 villages.
