= Mahindra & Mahindra =

Indian automobile manufacturer

Mahindra & Mahindra Limited
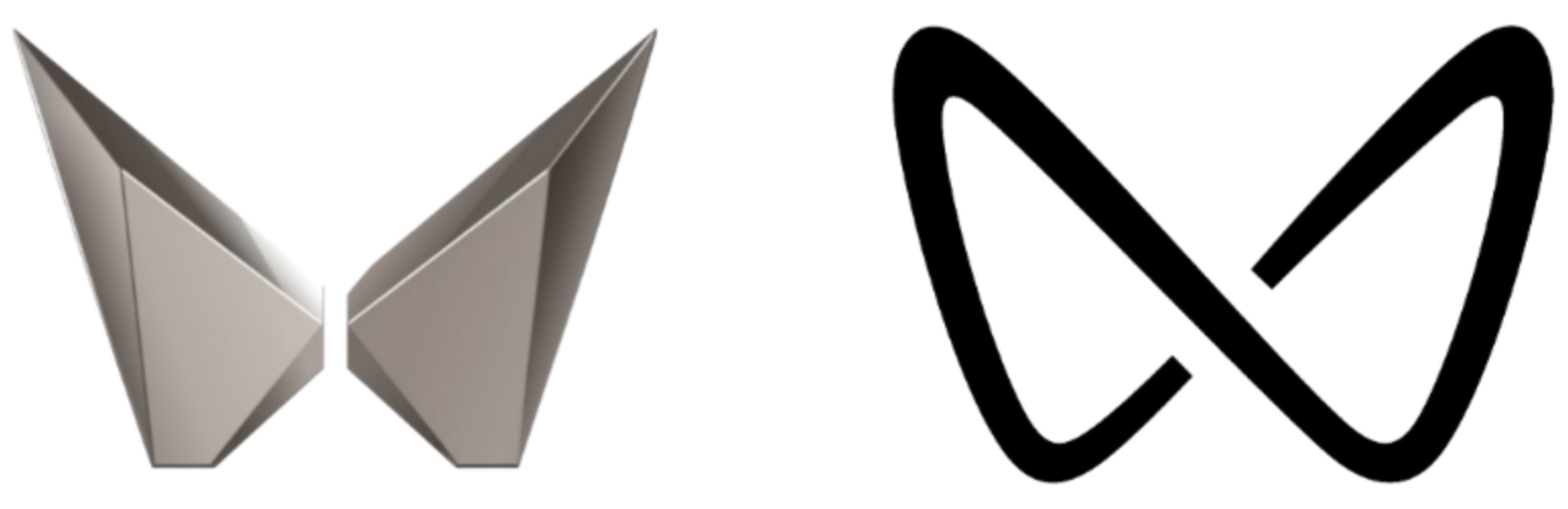
- Mahindra Automotive logo
- Type: Public
- Traded as: BSE: 500520; NSE: M&M; BSE SENSEX constituent; NSE NIFTY 50 constituent
- ISIN: INE101A01026
- Industry: Automotive
- Founded: 2 October 1945; 81 years ago (as Mahindra & Mohammed)
- Founders: J. C. Mahindra; K. C. Mahindra; Malik Ghulam Muhammad
- Headquarters: Worli, Mumbai, India
- Area served: India; South Africa; Nepal; Bhutan; Australia
- Key people: Anand Mahindra (Chairman); Anish Shah (MD & CEO); Rajesh Jejurikar (Executive Director AFS)
- Products: Automobiles; SUVs; Commercial vehicles; Tractors; Motorcycles
- Production output: ▲594,000 (PV) (2025)
- Revenue: ▲₹203,175 crore (US$22 billion) (FY2026)
- Operating income: ▲₹37,561 crore (US$4.0 billion) (FY2026)
- Net income: ▲₹18,622 crore (US$2.0 billion) (FY2026)
- Total assets: ▲₹317,635 crore (US$34 billion) (FY2026)
- Total equity: ▲₹93,097 crore (US$9.9 billion) (FY2026)
- Number of employees: 67,700–68,600 (2025)
- Parent: Mahindra Group
- Divisions: Mahindra Automotive; Mahindra Tractors; Mahindra Truck and Bus Division; Mahindra Two Wheelers
- Subsidiaries: Classic Legends (60%); Pininfarina; SML Mahindra (58.97%); Mahindra & Mahindra Financial Services (52.48%); Mahindra Lifespaces (52.40%); Mahindra Holidays (66.73%)
- Website: auto.mahindra.com

Mahindra & Mahindra Limited (M&M) is an Indian automobile manufacturing company, headquartered in Mumbai. It was established in 1945 as Mahindra & Mohammed and later renamed Mahindra & Mahindra. Part of the Mahindra Group, Mahindra Automotive is one of the largest SUV manufacturers by production in India and Mahindra Tractors is the largest manufacturer of tractors in the world by volume. The company also manufactures commercial vehicles through its Truck and Bus Division and SML Mahindra subsidiary.

M&M was ranked 18th on a list of top companies in India by Fortune India 500 in 2025. Its major competitors in the Indian vehicular market include Maruti Suzuki and Tata Motors. Anish Shah is the current CEO and Managing Director of Mahindra Automotive.

== History ==
Mahindra & Mahindra was founded as a steel trading company on 2 October 1945, in Ludhiana as Mahindra & Mohammed by brothers Kailash Chandra Mahindra and Jagdish Chandra Mahindra, along with Malik Ghulam Muhammad. Anand Mahindra, the present Chairman of Mahindra Group, is the grandson of Jagdish Chandra Mahindra. In 1948, Ghulam Mohammed decided to move to the newly formed Pakistan.The Mahindras were left with stationary and company stamp that said M&M. They did not have the financial resources to change the name. Since there were two Mahindra brothers in the business they decided to change the company name to Mahindra & Mahindra.

=== Beginnings with Jeep ===
They eventually saw a business opportunity in expanding into manufacturing and selling larger multi utility vehicle (MUVs) and started assembling under the licence of Willys Jeep in India. Soon, M&M was established as the Jeep manufacturer in India and later commenced manufacturing light commercial vehicles (LCVs) and agricultural tractors. Jeep was bought by American Motors Corporation in 1970; Jeeps continued to be built by Mahindra under licence from AMC and, in turn, under Chrysler after Chrysler bought AMC in 1987.

=== Acquisitions ===
In 1984, in an early overseas expansion, Mahindra acquired Greek vehicle maker Balkania, which, until then, produced some Mahindra models under license.

In 1999, Mahindra purchased 100% of Gujarat Tractors from the Government of Gujarat, and in 2017, Mahindra renamed it Gromax Agri Equipment Limited as part of its new brand strategy, and the models continue to be sold as Trakstar.

In 2007, M&M acquired Punjab Tractor Limited (PTL), making it the world's largest tractor manufacturer. Subsequent to this takeover, the former PTL was merged into M&M and transformed into the Swaraj division of Mahindra & Mahindra in 2009.

Over the past few years, the company has taken an interest in new industries and foreign markets. In 2008, they entered the two-wheeler industry by taking over Kinetic Motors in India.

In 2010, M&M took a 55% stake in the REVA Electric Car Company and in 2016, they renamed it Mahindra Electric Mobility Ltd after taking 100% ownership.

In 2011 Mahindra acquired a majority stake of South Korea's SsangYong Motor, turning it into a subsidiary. In December 2020, after Mahindra stopped funding it, SsangYong entered into receivership, de facto no longer being a Mahindra subsidiary from that point on, and de jure after November 2022, when a KG Group-led consortium completed the acquisition procedures for a controlling stake, moving SsangYong out of receivership.

In October 2014, Mahindra acquired a 51% controlling stake in Peugeot Motocycles and a 100% controlling stake in October 2019. In May 2015, Mahindra acquired a 33.33% stake in Japanese tractor manufacturer Mitsubishi Agricultural Machinery (MAM), a subsidiary of Mitsubishi Heavy Industries, renaming it as Mitsubishi Mahindra Agricultural Machinery.

In December 2015, Mahindra and its affiliate Tech Mahindra, through a special purpose vehicle (SPV), agreed to buy a 76.06% stake in Italian car designer Pininfarina, for €168 million.

In March 2016, Mahindra acquired 35% of Finland-based Sampo Rosenlew, entering the combine harvester business, subsequently increasing its stake in the company to 49.04% in December 2019.

In January 2017, Mahindra and Mahindra Ltd acquired a 75.1 equity stake in Hisarlar Makina Sanayi ve Ticaret Anonym Şirketi (Hisarlar), a farm equipment company, marking its entry into Turkey and in September 2017 acquired another Turkish tractor and foundry business Erkunt Traktor Sanayii AS for ₹800 crore.

In January 2018, Mahindra announced its foray into the sprayers business through the acquisition of a 26% equity stake in M.I.T.R.A. Agro Equipments Pvt. Ltd, a Maharashtra-based AgTech company (MITRA). In March 2020, Mahindra further increased its stake in the company to 39%.

In February 2018, Mahindra acquired a minority stake of 22.9% percent in Carnot Technologies. Carnot Technologies owns and operates smart car firm CarSense.

In May 2018, Mahindra signed a share subscription agreement to acquire up to 10% share capital of Canada's IT firm Resson Aerospace Corporation. Resson has developed a system that captures and interprets images to give farmers information about the state of their fields and crops.

In June 2019, Mahindra purchased an 11.25% stake in Switzerland-based agro technology firm Gamaya. The acquisition enabled Mahindra to further develop and deploy next-generation farming capabilities such as precision agriculture and digital farming technologies.

In December 2023, Mahindra & Mahindra acquired a 60.01% stake in Emergent Solren Private Limited, now a solar power generator subsidiary of Mahindra Holdings Limited, for ₹288.05 crore.

=== Licensed production and joint ventures ===
In November 2017, Mahindra signed a memorandum of understanding (MOU) agreement with Belgium-based Dewulf, a supplier of a full line of potato and root crop machinery. Under the agreement, Mahindra will manufacture and market potato planting equipment in India, for which the co-branded planter is developed.

In April 2010, Mahindra and Renault ended its joint venture which operated from 2005 onwards, with Mahindra buying out Renault's stake. Renault continues to license and supply key components such as engines and transmissions to Mahindra & Mahindra.

Mahindra & Mahindra (M&M) and Ford Motor Company (Ford) first formed a joint venture to manufacture Ford cars in India, Mahindra Ford India. The JV manufactured its cars including the Ford Escort, at Nashik factory of Mahindra. In 2003, Ford increased its stake in the company to 72% and renamed it Ford India.

In October 2019, Mahindra entered into a joint venture with Ford by establishing Ford India in which Mahindra & Mahindra acquired a controlling 51% stake.

In January 2021, Mahindra ended its collaboration with Ford owing to global economic and business conditions caused by the pandemic.

== Operations ==
Under the "Mahindra" brand name, the company produces SUVs, Multi utility vehicles, pickups, lightweight commercial vehicles, heavyweight commercial vehicles and tractors. Mahindra maintains business relations with foreign companies like Renault SA, France. M&M has a global presence and its products are exported to several countries. Its automotive global subsidiaries include:

- Mahindra Europe S.r.l. based in Italy,
- Mahindra Automotive North America (MANA) in US.,
- Automobili Pininfarina in Italy
- Mahindra South Africa
- Mahindra Australia

=== Automobiles ===
Mahindra began assembling the Jeep CJ3 in 1954, and light commercial vehicles in 1965. In 1979 the licensed assembly of Peugeot diesel four-cylinder engines and transmissions began, and in 1982 a tie-up with Kia Motors to build their four-speed KMT90 transmission and transfer case was announced. Mahindra's MM range was a mainstay of the lineup and was eventually also offered with a 1.8-liter Isuzu petrol engine in addition to International and Peugeot diesels.

In 1965 in Pimpri, Pune, Mahindra and Mahindra Ltd formed Roplas India Ltd. as a joint venture with Rubery Owen, a Darlaston-based engineering firm, to manufacture after market fibre glass bodies for Mahindra 91, 101, and 104.5 licensed versions of Jeep CJ which included every possible configuration service vans, police bodies, off-roader and ambulance models. They collaboratively also formed Mahindra Owen at Pune in 1958, an engineering company to manufacture truck trailers, one of the first trailer manufacturer of India.

In December 1989 Mahindra launched its 4x4 offroad SUV range which consisted of licence-built versions of the Jeep CJ named Brave, Chief, and Baja. These were powered by four-cylinder, 2.1-litre Peugeot diesel engines producing 62 hp and were available in 2032mm and 2311mm wheelbase variants. These were sold under motor industry investments, a joint venture between Paul Stoddart an Australian businessman and Roger Bastable founder of Abby Hill Group.

Mahindra started making passenger vehicles firstly with the Logan in April 2007 under the Mahindra Renault joint venture. M&M made its maiden entry into the heavy trucks segment with the Mahindra Truck and Bus Division, the joint venture with International Truck, USA. Mahindra produces a wide range of vehicles, including MUVs, LCVs and three-wheelers. It manufactures over 20 models of cars, including larger, multi-utility vehicles like the Scorpio and the Bolero. It formerly had a joint venture called Ford India Private Limited to build passenger cars.

At the 2008 Delhi Auto Show, Mahindra executives said the company was pursuing an aggressive product expansion program that would see the launch of several new platforms and vehicles over the next three years, including an entry-level SUV designed to seat five passengers and powered by a small, turbocharged Diesel engine. True to their word, Mahindra & Mahindra launched the Mahindra Xylo in January 2009, selling over 15,000 units in its first six months.

Also in early 2008, Mahindra commenced its first overseas CKD operations with the launch of the Mahindra Scorpio in Egypt, in partnership with the Bavarian Auto Group. This was soon followed by assembly facilities in Brazil.

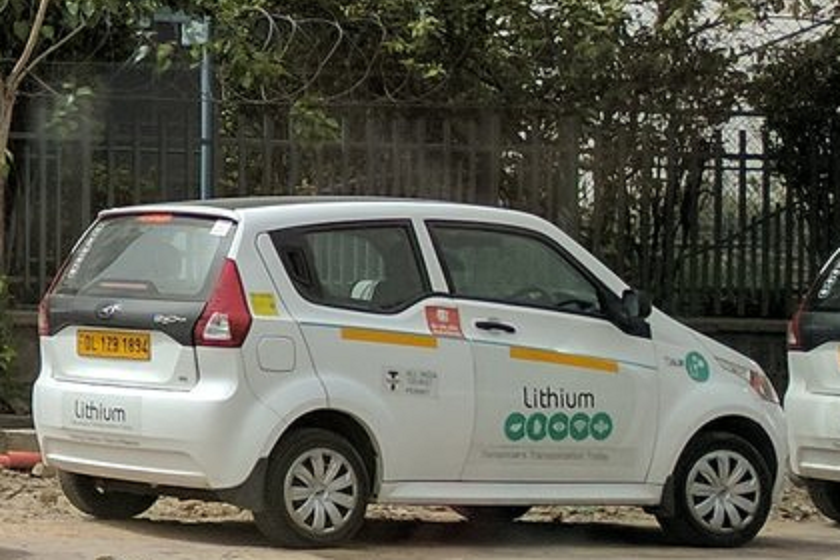
Mahindra electric car

Mahindra & Mahindra has a controlling stake in Mahindra REVA Electric Vehicles.

Mahindra launched its relatively heavily publicized SUV, XUV500, code-named as W201 in September 2011. The new SUV by Mahindra was designed in-house and it was developed on the first global SUV platform that could be used for developing more SUVs. In India, the new Mahindra XUV500 came in a price range between ₹1,140,000–1,500,000. The company was expected to launch three products in 2015 (two SUVs and one CV) and an XUV500 hybrid. Besides India, the company also targeted Europe, Africa, Australia and Latin America for this model. Mahindra President Mr. Pawan Goenka stated that the company planned to launch six new models in the year. The company launched the CNG version of its mini truck Maxximo on 29 June 2012. A new version of the Mahindra Verito in Diesel and petrol options was launched by the company on 26 July 2012 to compete with Maruti's Dzire and Toyota Kirloskar Motor's Etios.

On 30 July 2015, Mahindra released sketches of a new compact SUV called the TUV300 slated to be launched on 10 September 2015. The TUV300 design took cues from a battle tank and used a downsized version of the mHAWK engine found on the XUV500, Scorpio and some models of the Xylo. This new engine was dubbed the mHAWK80.

In 2015, Mahindra introduced an app based intra-city cargo platform known as SMARTSHIFT, a load exchange platform for small commercial vehicles. In 2018, Mahindra announced the merger of SMARTSHIFT with Mumbai-based logistics provider Porter.

In January 2016 Mahindra launched a sub-compact monocoque SUV called the KUV100. The KUV100 received a major refresh in the form of the KUV100 NXT launched in October 2017.

On 3 September 2018, Mahindra Marazzo the shark inspired MPV was launched in collaboration with Mahindra Research Valley (MRV), MANA and Pininfarina in four variants.

In February 2019, Mahindra launched its XUV300, a sub-4m compact monocoque SUV. The XUV300 was found to be the safest vehicle made in India in an independent crash test conducted by GNCAP, earning it a 5-star adult safety rating along with India's first ‘Safer Choice’ Award.

In October 2020, Mahindra launched the second-generation Thar 2020 – the All-New Thar.

In 2021, Mahindra launched the XUV700.

On 27 June 2022, Mahindra released the Scorpio N, also called the "Big Daddy of SUVs". The previous generation will now be called, "Scorpio Classic".

=== Mahindra in North America ===
Mahindra planned to sell the diesel SUVs and pickup trucks starting in late 2010 in North America through an independent distributor, Global Vehicles USA, based in Alpharetta, Georgia. Mahindra announced it would import pickup trucks from India in knockdown kit (CKD) form to circumvent the Chicken tax. CKDs are complete vehicles that were assembled in the United States from kits of parts shipped in crates. On 18 October 2010, however, it was reported that Mahindra had indefinitely delayed the launch of vehicles into the North American market, citing legal issues between it and Global Vehicles after Mahindra retracted its contract with Global Vehicles earlier in 2010, due to a decision to sell the vehicles directly to consumers instead of through Global Vehicles. However, a November 2010 report quoted John Perez, the CEO of Global Vehicles USA, as estimating that he expected Mahindra's small Diesel pickups to go on sale in the United States by spring 2011, although legal complications remained, and Perez, while hopeful, admitted that arbitration could take more than a year. Later reports suggested that the delays may be due to Mahindra scrapping the original model of the truck and replacing it with an upgraded one before selling them to Americans. In June 2012, a mass tort lawsuit was filed against Mahindra by its American dealers, alleging the company of conspiracy and fraud. Mahindra Automotive North America (MANA), the company's U.S. subsidiary, opened a car manufacturing plant in Detroit, Michigan, on 20 November 2017. The plant employs 250 people and is the first automotive production facility to open in Detroit in 25 years. The first product from the new facility was launched on 2 March 2018 as the Mahindra Roxor.

=== Military vehicles ===
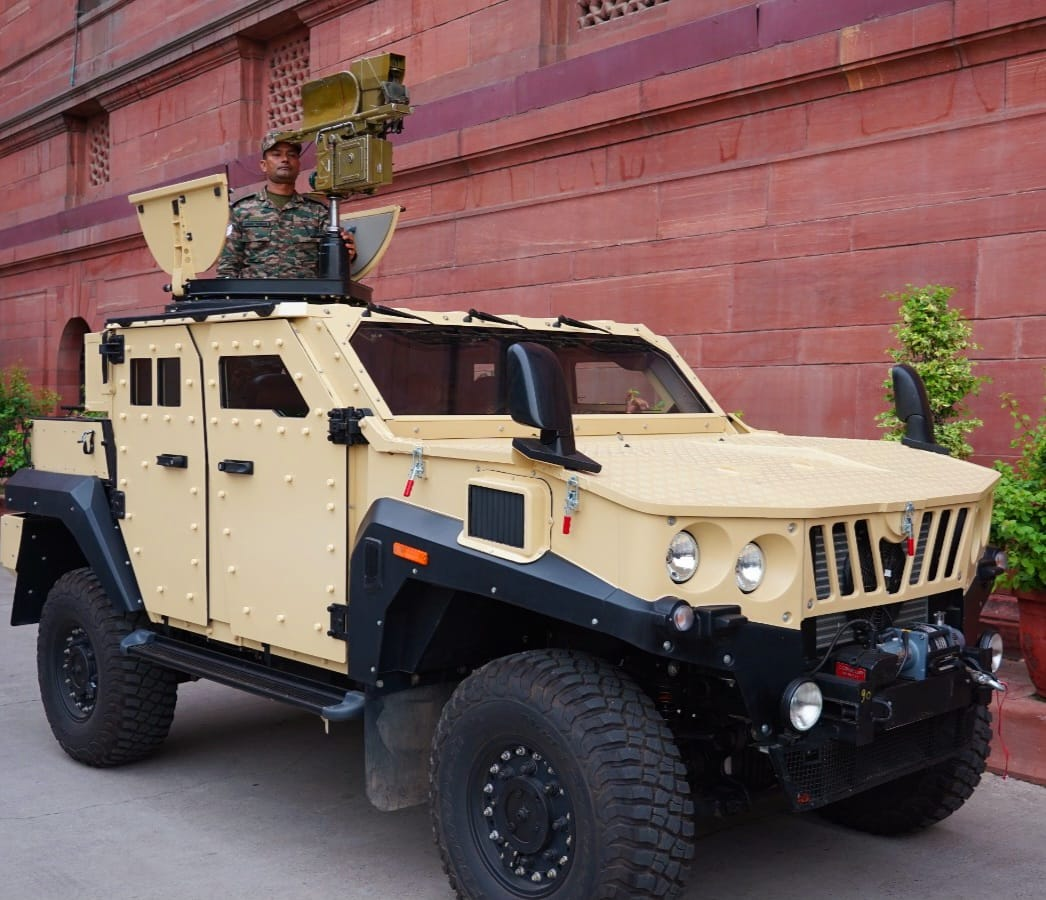
Mahindra Armored Light Specialist Vehicle

The company has built and assembled military vehicles, commencing in 1947 with the importation of the Willys Jeep that had been widely used in World War II. Its line of military vehicles under Mahindra Emirates Vehicle Armouring (MEVA, Mahindra Armoured) include the Mahindra Armored Light Specialist Vehicle (ALSV) and the Mahindra Armored Straton Armoured Personnel Carrier (APC), and discontinued vehicles such as the Axe. It also maintained a joint venture with BAE Systems, Defence Land Systems India; one of the first vehicles made under this was the Mahindra Mine Protected Vehicle-I (MPV-I).

=== Industrial gensets ===
Mahindra & Mahindra entered the energy sector in 2002, in response to growing demands for increased electric power in India, over 450,000 Mahindra Powerol engines and Diesel generator sets (gensets) hd its entry into gas powered genset with the launch of its first CNG/NG gensets. Mahindra Powerol was awarded the Deming Prize in 2014.

=== Farm equipment ===
Mahindra began manufacturing tractors for the Indian market during the early '60s. It is the top tractor company in the world (by volume) with annual sales totaling more than 200,000 tractors. Since its inception, the company has sold over 2.1 million tractors. Mahindra & Mahindra's farm equipment division (Mahindra Tractors) has over 1,000 dealers servicing approx. 1.45 million customers.

Mahindra tractors are available in 40 countries, including India, the United States, China, Australia, New Zealand, Africa (Nigeria, Mali, Chad, Gambia, Angola, Sudan, Ghana, and Morocco), Latin America (Chile, Argentina, Brazil, Venezuela, Central America, and the Caribbean), South Asia (Sri Lanka, Bangladesh, and Nepal), the Middle East (Iran and Syria) and Eastern Europe (Serbia, Turkey, and Macedonia). Mahindra Tractors manufactures its products at four plants in India, two in Mainland China, three in the United States, and one in Australia. It has three major subsidiaries: Mahindra USA, Mahindra (China) Tractor Company, and Mahindra Yueda (Yancheng) Tractor Company (a joint venture with the Jiangsu Yueda Group).

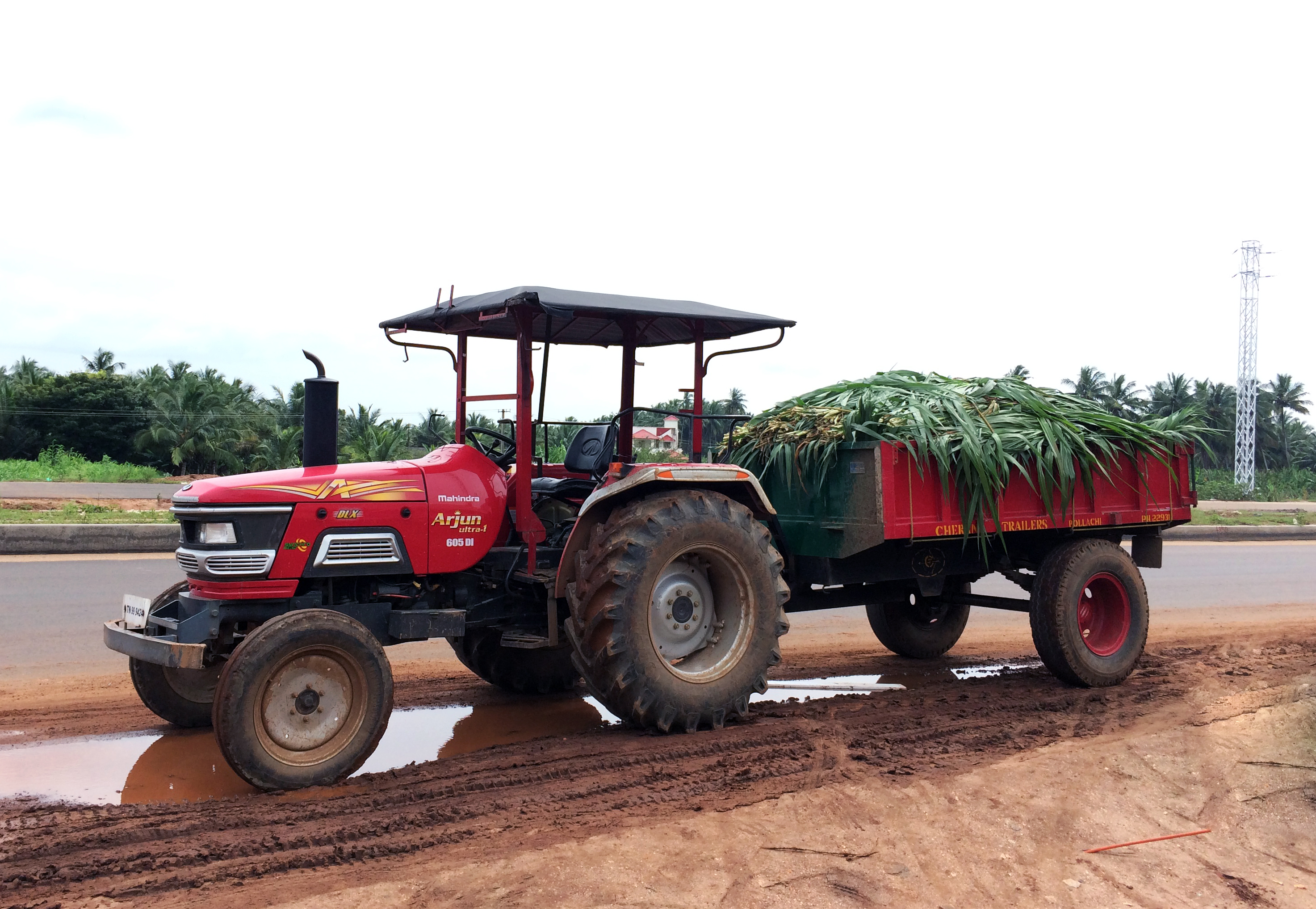
Mahindra Arjun 605 DI tractor with trailer

In 2003, the Farm Equipment Sector of Mahindra & Mahindra won the Deming Application Prize. In 2007 it received the Japan Quality Medal for implementing Total Quality Management in its entire business operations. The company has garnered the highest customer satisfaction index (CSI) in the industry at 88 percent. It earned a 2008 Golden Peacock Award in the Innovative Product/Services category for its in-house development of a load car. In its 2009 survey of Asia's 200 most admired and innovative companies, the Wall Street Journal named Mahindra & Mahindra one of the 10 most innovative Indian companies.

In addition to tractors, Mahindra sells other farm equipment. It has expanded its product-line to include farm mechanisation products via Mahindra AppliTrac.

In 2017, Mahindra & Mahindra Ltd's Farm Equipment Sector (FES) launched 'JIVO' a small tractor platform in the sub 25HP category.

In 2020, the company launched the Sarpanch Plus range. This ranges between 30 bhp and 50 bhp, and has undergone a subtle improvement as compared to the Sarpanch 575 tractor which was launched earlier. In 2020, Mahindra also launched new equipment for potato planting. PlantingMaster Potato + is designed in collaboration with Dewulf. On 2 October 2020, Mahindra rolled out Krish-e centers under its new ‘Farming as a Service’ business. This business vertical provides progressive, affordable and accessible tech-driven services to farmers.

In October 2021, Mahindra's FES launched a next-generation Yuvo tractor platform - a new-age advanced tractor range called the Yuvo Tech+.

In August 2023, Mahindra launched the Oja range of next-generation tractors.

== Models ==
=== Passenger vehicles ===
==== Current models ====
===== ICE vehicles =====
Model	Calendar year introduced	Current model	Vehicle information
Model	Calendar year introduced	Introduction	Vehicle information
SUV
Bolero	2000	2025	Mid-size SUV
Bolero Neo	2016 (as Mahindra TUV 300)	2025	Mini SUV
Thar OG	2010	2026	4x4 Compact SUV
Thar Roxx	2024	2024	4x4 Mid-size SUV
Scorpio	2002	2022	C-segment SUV
Scorpio-N	2022	2022	D-segment SUV
Crossover SUV
XUV 3XO	2024	2024	B-segment crossover SUV
XUV 7XO	2026	2026	D-segment crossover SUV
Pick-up truck
Scorpio Lifestyler	2006	2026	Mid-size pickup truck
UTV
Roxor	2018	2021	4x4 off-road only UTV

===== Electric vehicles =====
Model	Calendar year introduced	Current model	Vehicle information
Model	Calendar year introduced	Introduction	Vehicle information
Crossover SUV
XUV 3XO EV	2026	2026	B-segment Crossover SUV
BE 6	2024	2024	C-segment coupé SUV
XEV 9S	2025	2025	D-segment crossover SUV
XEV 9e	2024	2024	D-segment coupé SUV

==== Discontinued models ====
Model	Released	Discontinued	Image	Notes
Armada	1993	2001		
Voyager	1997	2002		
Major	2004	2010		
Marksman	2006	2020		
Xylo	2009	2019		
Maxximo	2010	2015		
XUV500	2011	2021		Replaced by XUV700
Quanto	2012	2016		
e2o	2013	2017		
Verito Vibe	2013	2019		
TUV 300	2015	2020		Replaced by Bolero Neo
KUV100	2016	2023		The facelift called the KUV 100 NXT was discontinued in 2023
Nuvosport	2016	2020		
TUV300 Plus	2018	2020		Replaced by Bolero Neo Plus
Alturas G4	2018	2022		Rebadged from Ssangyong Rexton
Marazzo	2018	2024		Still available for sale
XUV300	2019	2024		Replaced by its facelift called XUV 3XO
XUV700	2021	2026		Replaced by its facelift called XUV 7XO
XUV400	2023	2026		Replaced by its facelift called XUV 3XO EV

=== Motorized Trike ===
- Alfa DX
- Alfa DX (CNG)

=== Motorized Cargo Trike ===
- Alfa Plus
- Alfa Plus (CNG)

=== Pickup Truck ===
- Bolero Pik-Up
- Maxx Pik-Up City
- Maxx Pik-Up HD (heavy duty, 2000kg payload)
- Jeeto Strong
- Supro Maxi Truck
- Supro Mini Truck
- Veero

=== Truck ===
- Blazo Haulage
- Blazo Tipper
- Blazo Tractor Trailer
- Furio
- Jayo
- Loadking Optimo

=== Bus ===
- Cruzio
- Cruzio Grande

=== Concepts ===
- BE.05 (Launched as BE 6 on 26 November 2024)
- BE.07
- BE.09
- BE.RALL-E (Launched as BE 6 FE on 27 November 2025)
- Vision X
- Vision Rolls royce
- Vision SXT
- Vision S4
- XUV.e8 (Launched as XEV 9S on 27 November 2025)
- XUV.e9 (Launched as XEV 9e on 26 November 2024)
- XUV 700 petrol hybrid
- THAR.e

== Factories ==
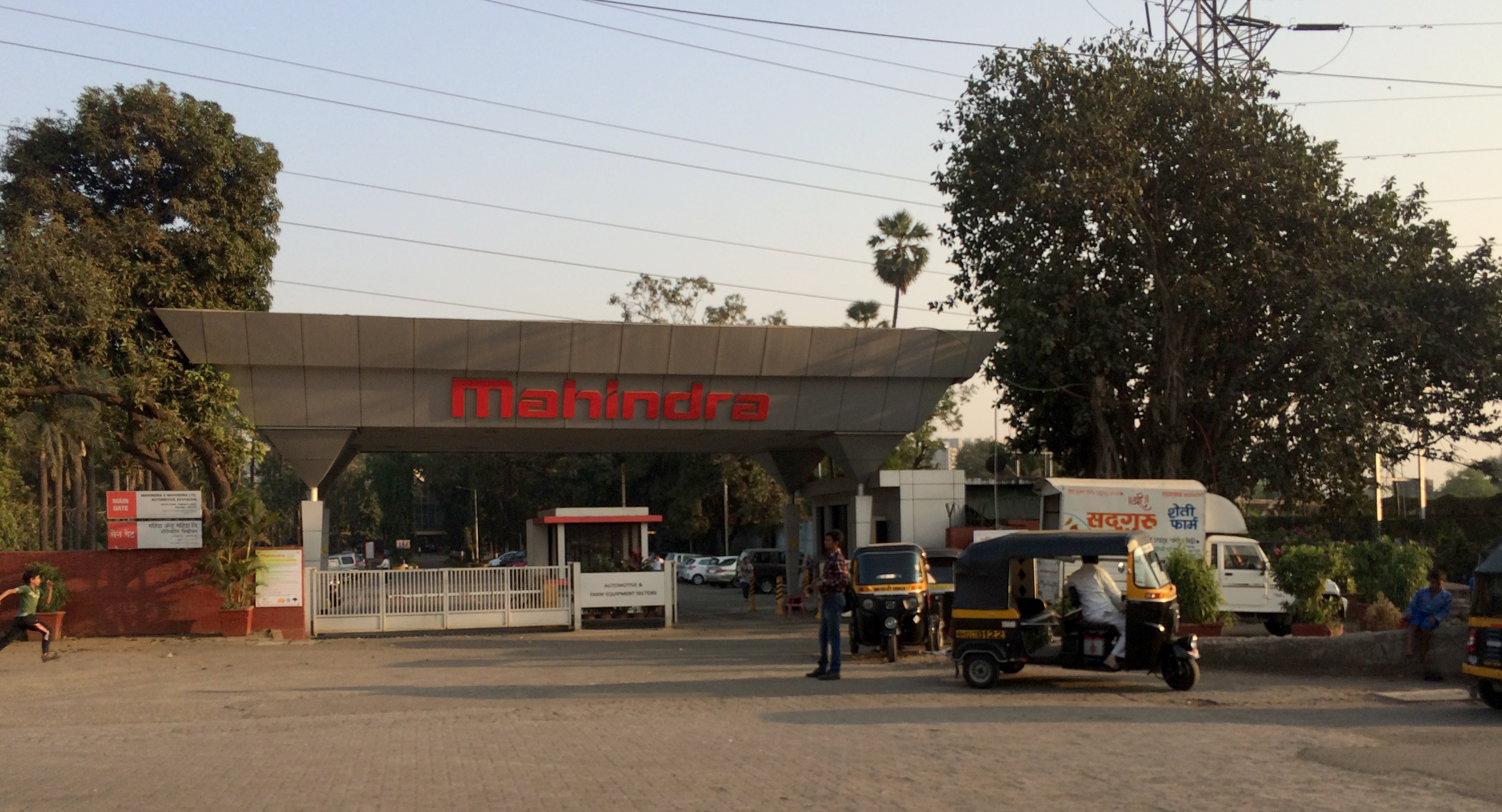
Mahindra & Mahindra's Kandivali Unit, Auto Sector Main gate overlooking Western Express Highway, Mumbai

Factory Type	City / State / Country	Type of manufacturing
Engines plant	Igatpuri, Nashik district, India MHEL Chakan	
Tool & Die plant	Nashik, India	Manufacturing of Dies
Multi-purpose units	Bengaluru, India	Passenger cars (electric) Small commercial vehicles (electric)
Aggregate + Assembly	Chakan (Pune), India	Passenger cars (electric) Small commercial vehicles (electric); Large commercial vehicles
Aggregate + Assembly	Kandivli (Mumbai), India	Pickups
Vehicle Assembly plant	Haridwar, India	Passenger cars Small commercial vehicles
Vehicle Assembly plant	Nashik, India	Passenger cars Small commercial vehicles
Vehicle Assembly plant	Zaheerabad, (Hyderabad) India	Small commercial vehicles Tractors
Overseas distributor plant	Durban, South Africa	Small commercial vehicles
Overseas distributor plant	Sousse, Tunisia	Small commercial vehicles
Overseas distributor plant	Mombasa, Kenya	Small commercial vehicles
Overseas distributor plant	Mutugama, Sri Lanka	Passenger cars
Overseas distributor plant	Detroit, USA	Passenger cars
Tractors only	Jaipur, India Zaheerabad, (Hyderabad) India; Mumbai, India; Mohali, India; Nagpur, India; Rudrapur, India; Vadodara, India; Majri, district Kurali	
Tractors only	Brisbane, Australia	
Tractors only	Houston, Texas, US Olivehurst, California, US; Bloomsburg, Pennsylvania, US	
Tractors only	Algeria	
Tractors only	Benin	
Tractors only	Gambia	
Tractors only	Ghana	
Tractors only	Nigeria	
Tractors only	Chad	
Tractors only	Mali	
Tractors only	South Africa	
Two-Wheelers only	Pithampur (Indore), India	

== Naming of vehicles ==
Most commercial and passenger vehicles made by the company follow the rule of ending with an 'O', like in Scorpio, Verito and XUV700. In 2013, the then president Pawan Goenka confirmed that this was after the success of Bolero and Scorpio, the company thought the ‘O’ at the end of the vehicle was lucky and it has become a tradition.

== Awards and recognitions ==
- Bombay Chamber Good Corporate Citizen Award for 2006–07.
- Businessworld FICCI-SEDF Corporate Social Responsibility Award 2007.
- The Brand Trust Report ranked M&M as India's 10th Most Trusted Brand in its India Study 2014 survey (from 20,000 brands analyzed).
- The Farm Equipment division received the Deming Prize in 2003.
- The Farm Equipment division received the Japan Quality Medal in 2007.
- The US based Reputation Institute ranked M&M amongst the top Ten Indian companies in its 'Global 200: The World's Best Corporate Reputations' list for 2008.
- Bluebytes News rated M&M as India's second Most Reputed Car Company (reported in their study titled Reputation Benchmark Study) conducted for the Auto (Cars) Sector in 2012.
- Mahindra won top Corporate Governance and CSR awards at Asiamoney Awards 2016.
- Mahindra was named ‘Manufacturing Innovator of the Year’ by Time India Awards in 2017.
- The company became the first Carbon Neutral plant facility in 2018.
- In 2018, seven automotive plants of Mahindra & Mahindra (M&M) bagged the prestigious Japan Institute of Plant Maintenance (JIPM) award.
- Mahindra was named India's Best Brand by Interbrand in 2019.
- Mahindra Automotive was recognised as ‘One of the Most Trusted Brands of India 2021’ by Team Marksmen and CNBC TV18.

== See also ==
- Automotive industry in India
- List of companies of India
- Mahindra Lifespaces
- Mahindra Racing
- Mahindra Susten
- Mahindra Two Wheelers
- Mahindra & Mahindra Financial Services Limited
- Mahindra Truck and Bus Division
