= Shailesh Jejurikar =

Indian-American business executive

- Born: Mumbai, India
- Education: Mumbai University (BA), Indian Institute of Management Lucknow (MBA)
- Known for: CEO and president of Procter & Gamble, board member

Shailesh Jejurikar is an Indian-American business executive. He is the first Asian CEO of Procter & Gamble (P&G).

== Career ==
Jejurikar began working at P&G in 1989, starting as an assistant brand manager and managing businesses across India, East Africa, ASEAN, Korea, Singapore and North America. This included projects in P&G's fabric and home division, including brands such as Tide, Ariel and Downy.

In 2014, Jejurikar became the North American president of fabric care, becoming global president the following year. He was appointed COO of P&G in July 2021.

On January 1, 2026, Jejurikar succeeded Jon R. Moeller as president and CEO of P&G. He has promoted a consumer-first approach for P&G, with examples such as the development of diapers made with silk fibers in China and formula upgrades to Tide in the United States.

On August 1, 2026, Jejurikar became Chairman of the Board at P&G.
