= S. P. Jain Institute of Management and Research =

Business school in Mumbai, India

S. P. Jain Institute of Management & Research
- Motto: आ नो भद्राः क्रतवो यन्तु विश्वतः
- Motto in English: Let noble thoughts come to us from every side
- Type: Private business school
- Established: April 17, 1981; 45 years ago
- Parent institution: Bharatiya Vidya Bhavan
- Accreditation: AACSB; AMBA; EQUIS
- Affiliations: AICTE, AIU
- Dean: Varun Nagaraj
- Location: Mumbai, Maharashtra, India; 19.1231°N 72.8361°E
- Campus: 45 acres (18 ha); Urban, 45 acres (18 ha)
- Website: spjimr.org

The Shreyans Prasad Jain Institute of Management & Research (SPJIMR) is a private business school in Mumbai, Maharashtra, India. It is a constituent institution of the Bharatiya Vidya Bhavan and became an autonomous institute in 1992 after separating from the University of Mumbai. Founded in 1981, the institute is named after industrialist Shreyans Prasad Jain and offers postgraduate, family business and entrepreneurship, executive, social sector development and doctoral programmes in management. Its main campus is in Andheri, Mumbai, and it has a Centre in New Delhi for executive education.

The institute was established as the Bharatiya Vidya Bhavan's Institute of Management Studies and was inaugurated in 1981 by British Prime Minister Margaret Thatcher. Dr. Manesh L. Shrikant became its honorary dean in the mid-1980s and headed the institute after its separation from the University of Mumbai in 1992. The curriculum during this period included social-sector work as part of management education. The institute later introduced the Development of Corporate Citizenship (DoCC) and Abhyudaya initiatives, and in 1997, it started a postgraduate programme for members of family-managed businesses.

SPJIMR received AACSB accreditation in 2018 and EQUIS accreditation in 2024. It is also accredited by the Association of MBAs (AMBA). Its two-year Post Graduate Diploma in Management (PGDM) has featured in the Financial Times Masters in Management global top 50 for seven consecutive years. The programme was ranked 35th worldwide in both 2024 and 2025, and 26th globally and second in India in 2026.

In 2026, SPJIMR's Post Graduate Programme in Management (PGPM), its 18-month leadership-focused programme for experienced professionals, was ranked #74 globally in the Financial Times (FT) Global MBA 2026 ranking. FT noted that SPJIMR was the highest new entrant in the year's MBA table.

== History ==
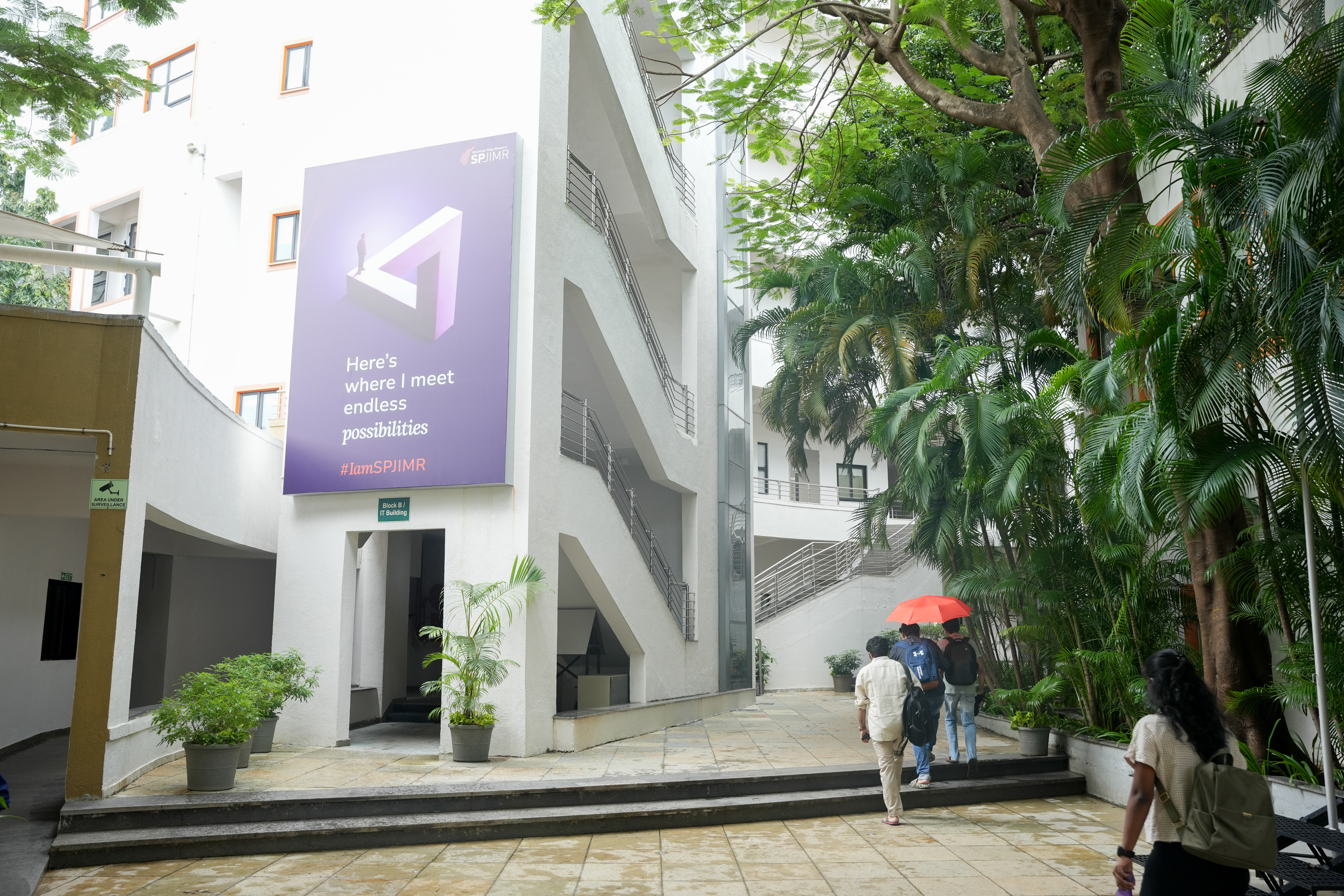
Courtyard at the SPJIMR campus in Mumbai, India

SPJIMR was established in 1981 by the Bharatiya Vidya Bhavan, an educational trust founded in 1938 by Kanaiyalal Maneklal Munshi, as its Institute of Management Studies. The foundation stone was laid on 17 April 1981 by British Prime Minister Margaret Thatcher during a visit to India. She also addressed the institute on the occasion. The first cohort of the Master of Management Studies (MMS) programme enrolled that year. The institute was named after industrialist Shreyans Prasad Jain. It was initially affiliated with the University of Bombay, later renamed the University of Mumbai.

Manesh L. Shrikant, who held a doctorate in business administration from Harvard Business School and had previously headed the engineering firm Mukand, became the institute's honorary dean in the mid-1980s. He served without a salary and remained at SPJIMR for close to three decades. In 1992, the institute separated from the University of Mumbai and became autonomous in admissions, curriculum and faculty recruitment. The MMS programme was reconstituted as the Post Graduate Diploma in Management (PGDM). During Shrikant's tenure, the institute introduced programmes that brought social and ethical issues into management education. These included the Development of Corporate Citizenship (DoCC), through which students spend several weeks working with non-profit organisations, mainly in rural India. It also introduced a course based on the Bhagavad Gita, which was later renamed "Science of Spirituality". In 1997, SPJIMR established a Centre for Family Business and launched a postgraduate programme for members of family-managed businesses. At its 25th anniversary, the institute described the programme as the first of its kind in India.

Ranjan Banerjee succeeded Shrikant as dean in June 2015 and remained in the position until 2021. SPJIMR received AACSB accreditation in 2018 and opened its New Delhi Centre the same year. Varun Nagaraj, an IIT Bombay graduate who had worked in technology-industry management in the United States, was announced as Dean in June 2021 and took charge in September. In December 2024, SPJIMR received EQUIS accreditation from the European Foundation for Management Development. It was reaccredited by AMBA and received accreditation from the Business Graduates Association in 2025. In March 2026, Nagaraj was appointed to the AACSB board of directors for a three-year term. The association said this was the first time an India-based business school had been represented on the board.

== Campus ==
SPJIMR is located on the Bharatiya Vidya Bhavan campus at Munshi Nagar on Dadabhai Road in Andheri West, Mumbai. The campus is shared with other institutions of the trust and covers about 45 acres (18 ha).

A design thinking laboratory was established in 2016. A building opened in 2019 added classrooms, group-work rooms, a three-storey library and an auditorium named after former dean M. L. Shrikant. The institute's New Delhi Centre is located on the premises of the Bharatiya Vidya Bhavan on Kasturba Gandhi Marg. It is used for executive and short-term programmes.

== Academic programmes ==
SPJIMR's principal programme is the two-year, full-time Post Graduate Diploma in Management (PGDM), which the Association of Indian Universities (AIU) recognises as equivalent to a master's degree. It is offered alongside a separate two-year diploma in business management. The PGDM was approved by the All India Council for Technical Education (AICTE) in 1994 and first accredited by the National Board of Accreditation (NBA) in 2007. In 2023, the institute began offering the PGDM Online through Coursera.

SPJIMR also offers the 18-month Post Graduate Programme in Management (PGPM) for experienced professionals. The programme was approved by AICTE in 2013. It includes Restart, an initiative for women returning to work after a career break. In 2026, it was ranked 74th in the Financial Times Global MBA ranking and was the highest-ranked new entrant that year.

The institute also runs programmes for specific groups of professionals. The Post Graduate Programme in Family Managed Business, established in 1997, is for members of business families. SPJIMR also offers executive and modular programmes for working managers and doctoral study through the Fellow Programme in Management, established in 2016. The programme has doctoral equivalence from the Association of Indian Universities.

SPJIMR's programmes have received programme-level accreditation from the Association of MBAs since 2010, when three programmes were covered. By 2023, the number had increased to six.

== Pedagogy and social engagement ==
SPJIMR states its mission as "influence practice and promote value-based growth" and includes social-sector engagement in its management programmes. Under the Development of Corporate Citizenship (DoCC) programme, full-time students spend several weeks working with grassroots and non-profit organisations. The Abhyudaya initiative pairs students with children from low-income families in Mumbai, who receive mentoring from the students.

SPJIMR is a signatory to the United Nations-supported Principles for Responsible Management Education (PRME). In 2018, its DoCC and Abhyudaya programmes received an Innovative Practices Award from the UN Global Compact Network India. In 2021, SPJIMR received the highest rating in the Positive Impact Rating, a student-led assessment of the social performance of business schools conducted by a Swiss non-profit association. Academic research on responsible management education in India has also examined SPJIMR's use of social responsibility in its teaching.

In October 2025, the institute was recognised by the Federation of Indian Chambers of Commerce and Industry (FICCI) with the Higher Education Excellence Award for its pioneering Abhyudaya initiative in the category "Institutional Social Responsibility (Private)". The award was presented by Nitin Gadkari, Union Minister of Road Transport and Highways, Government of India, at the 20th FICCI Higher Education Summit held in New Delhi on October 6.

== Accreditation and rankings ==
SPJIMR holds AACSB accreditation, received in 2018, as well as AMBA and EQUIS accreditation, received in 2024. It is recognised by the All India Council for Technical Education as an autonomous Category-I institution.

In the Financial Times Masters in Management 2026 ranking, SPJIMR was ranked 26th globally and second in India. In the Financial Times Global MBA 2026 ranking, its Post Graduate Programme in Management (PGPM) was ranked 74th globally. The Financial Times described SPJIMR as the highest new entrant in the 2026 MBA ranking.

In the BT-MDRA India's Best B-Schools Ranking 2026, SPJIMR was ranked fourth in India and first among private business schools. The India Today Group MDRA Best Business Schools Survey 2025 also placed it fourth overall and first among private business schools. SPJIMR was fifth overall and first among private business schools in the Fortune India Best B-Schools 2025 ranking. In the MBAUniverse.com Rankings 2026, it was fourth overall and first among private business schools. The Week's 2025 ranking placed SPJIMR sixth overall and second among private business schools, while the Business World 2025 ranking gave it the same positions.

The institute has appeared in the Financial Times Masters in Management global top 50 for seven consecutive years as of 2026.

== Notable alumni ==
=== Business and corporate leadership ===
- Anant Bajaj, Managing Director, Bajaj Electricals
- Debjani Ghosh, former President, NASSCOM
- Jyoti Deshpande, Chief Executive Officer, Jio Studios
- Pradeep Kar, Founder and Chairman, Microland
- Rajesh Jejurikar, Executive Director, Mahindra Group
- Girish Wagh, Managing Director and CEO, Tata Motors Commercial Vehicles

=== Entrepreneurship and technology ===
- Madan Padaki, co-founder of MeritTrac Services and CEO of Head Held High Services
- Mahesh Madhavan, Indian businessman and CEO of Bacardi

=== Arts and entertainment ===
- Siddharth, film actor and screenwriter
- Ashutosh Lobo Gajiwala, Indian actor and entrepreneur, known for playing the young Salim Malik in Slumdog Millionaire

=== Sports ===
- Dipankar Bhattacharjee, Olympic badminton player

=== History and social development ===
- Vikram Sampath, historian
