= Mahindra KUV100 =

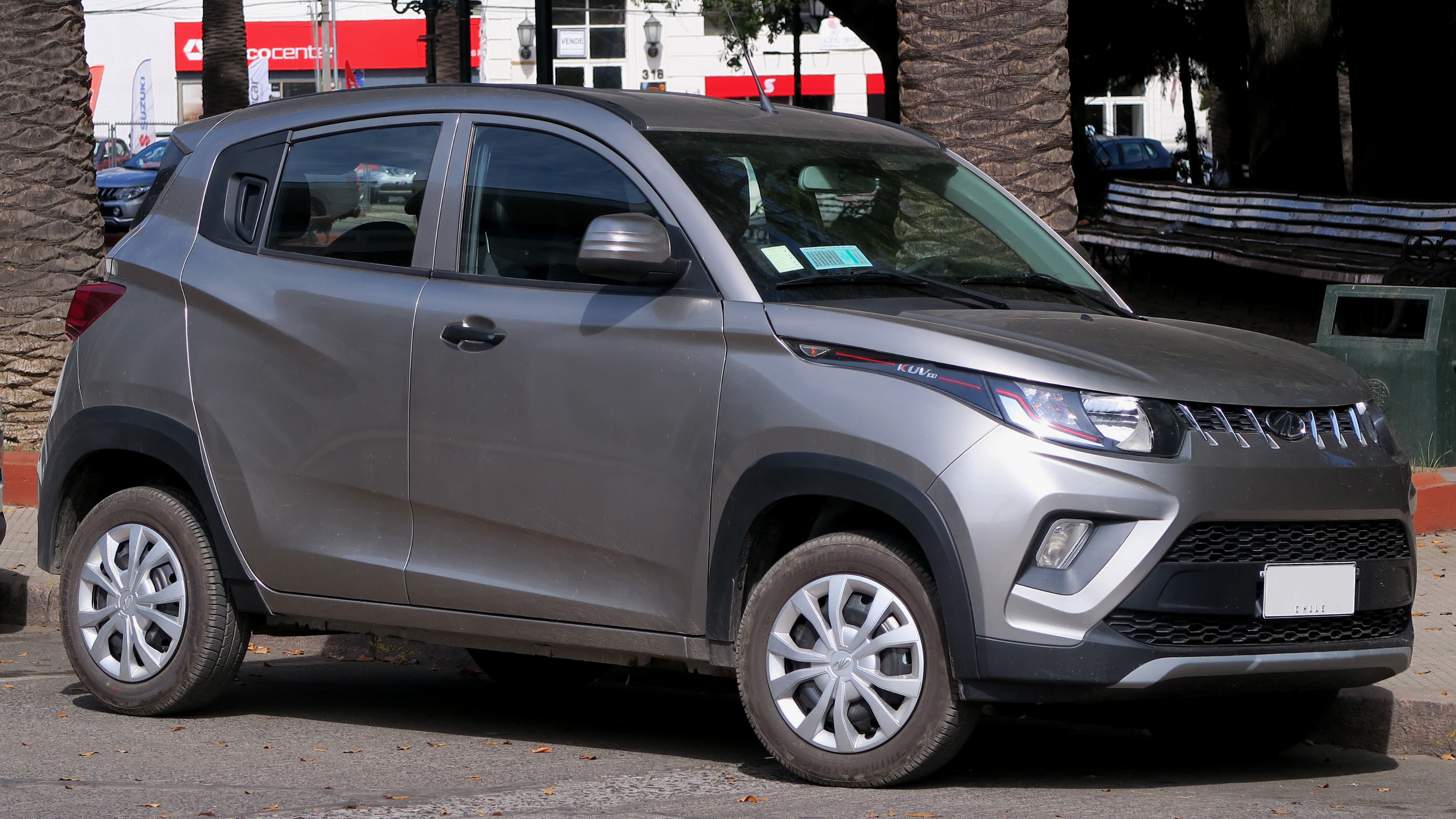
- 2019 Mahindra KUV100 (Chile)

Overview
- Manufacturer: Mahindra & Mahindra
- Production: 2016–2023
- Assembly: Chakan, Maharashtra (299, Union Place, Colombo 02)
- Designer: Mahindra Research Valley, Chennai

Body and chassis
- Class: Crossover city car
- Body style: 5-door hatchback
- Layout: Front-engine, FWD

Powertrain
- Engine: 1.2L mFalcon I3 petrol 1.2L mHawk I3 diesel
- Transmission: 5-speed manual 5-speed automatic

Dimensions
- Wheelbase: 2,385 mm (93.9 in)
- Length: 3,675 mm (144.7 in)
- Width: 1,705 mm (67.1 in)
- Height: 1,635 mm (64.4 in)

Mahindra KUV100 also known as KUV100 NXT was a crossover city car automobile designed and manufactured by the Indian company Mahindra & Mahindra.

== Variants ==
KUV100 has 14 versions available in India. It is offered in 7 petrol and 7 diesel models, K2, K4, K6 and K8. It comes in 7 colours, namely, Flamboyant Red, Aquamarine, Fiery Orange, Pearl White, Dazzling Silver, Designer Grey and Midnight Black.

An all-electric version of KUV100 named e-KUV100 was revealed in Auto Expo 2018. The e-KUV100 is built on the carmaker's new light EV platform called MESMA 48. The Mahindra e-KUV100 has a single electric motor that generates 54.35 PS of power and 120 Nm of torque. Powered by a 15.9 kWh battery, the e-KUV100 can offer a range of 147 km in a single charge and it will be priced around ₹8.25 lakh (ex-showroom Delhi). It is expected to go on sale by January 2021.

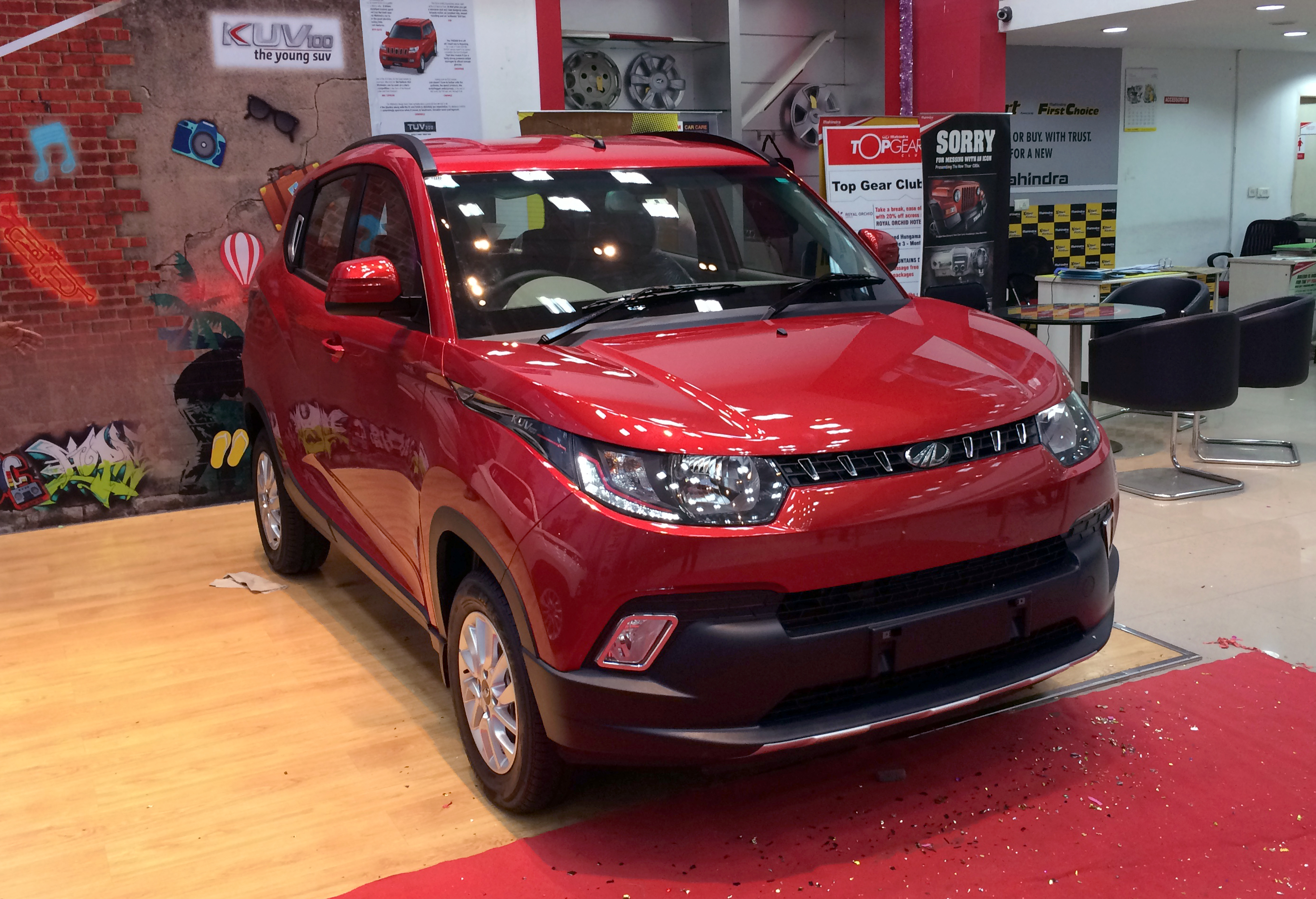
Pre-facelift (front)

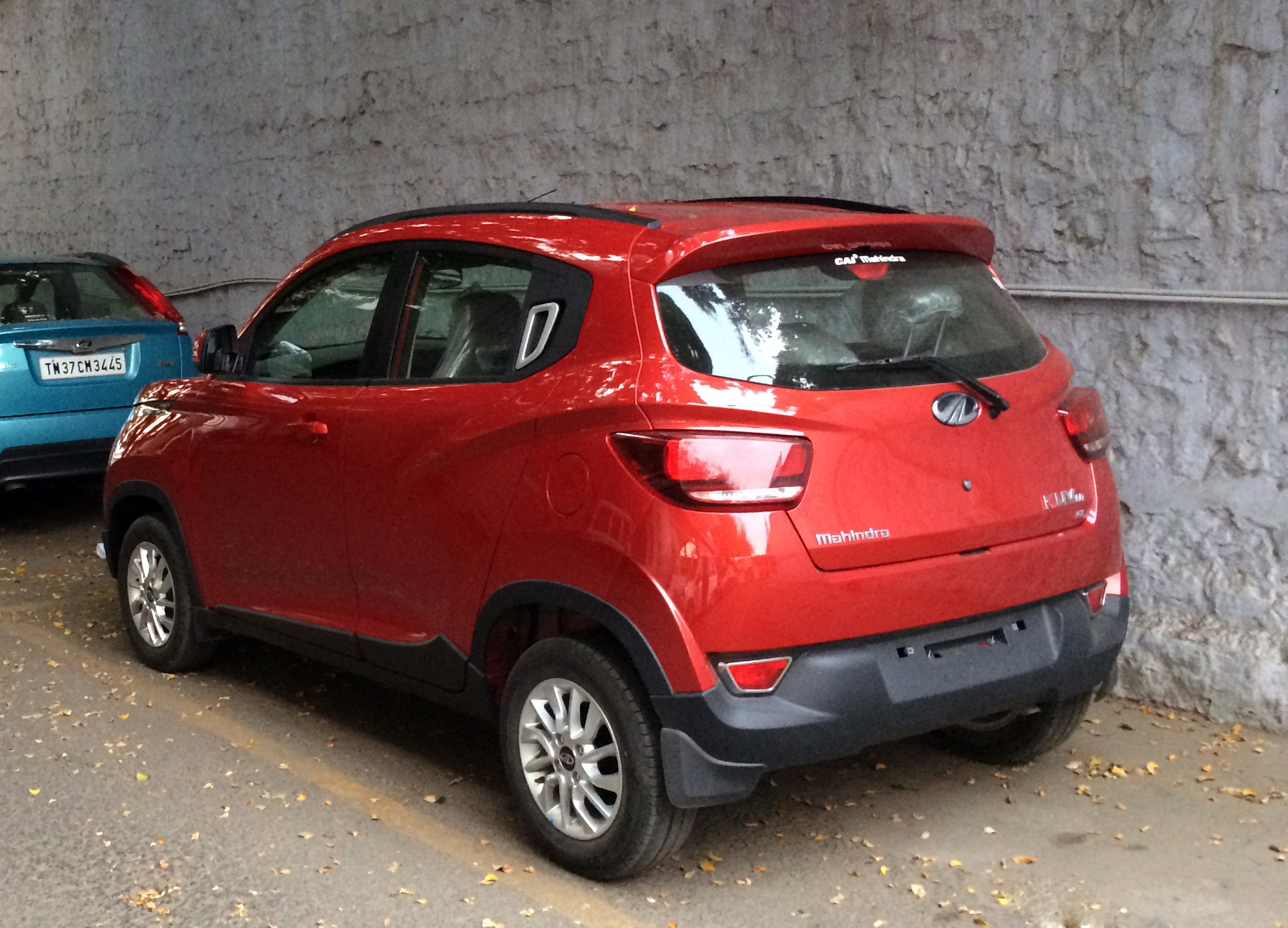
Pre-facelift (rear)

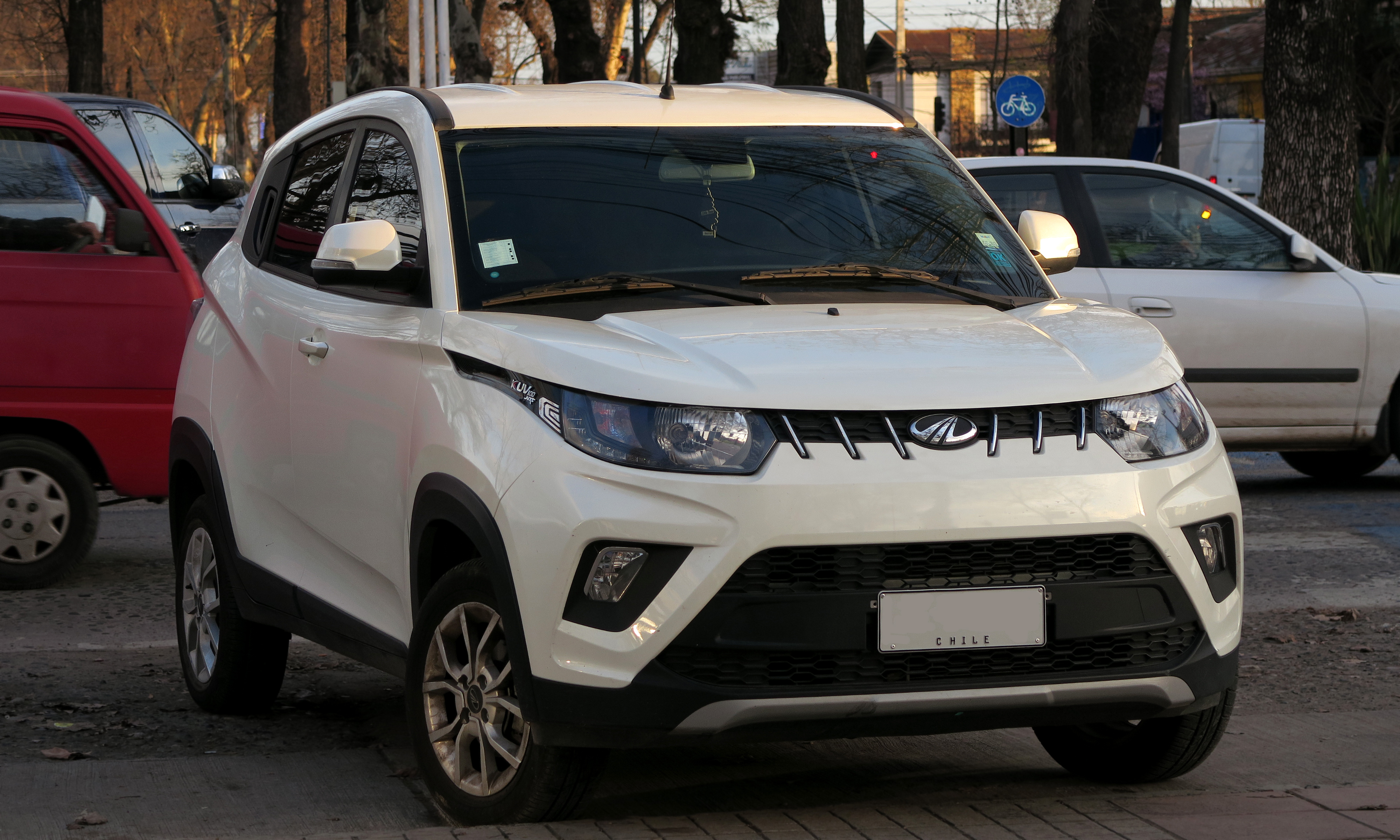
Facelift (front)

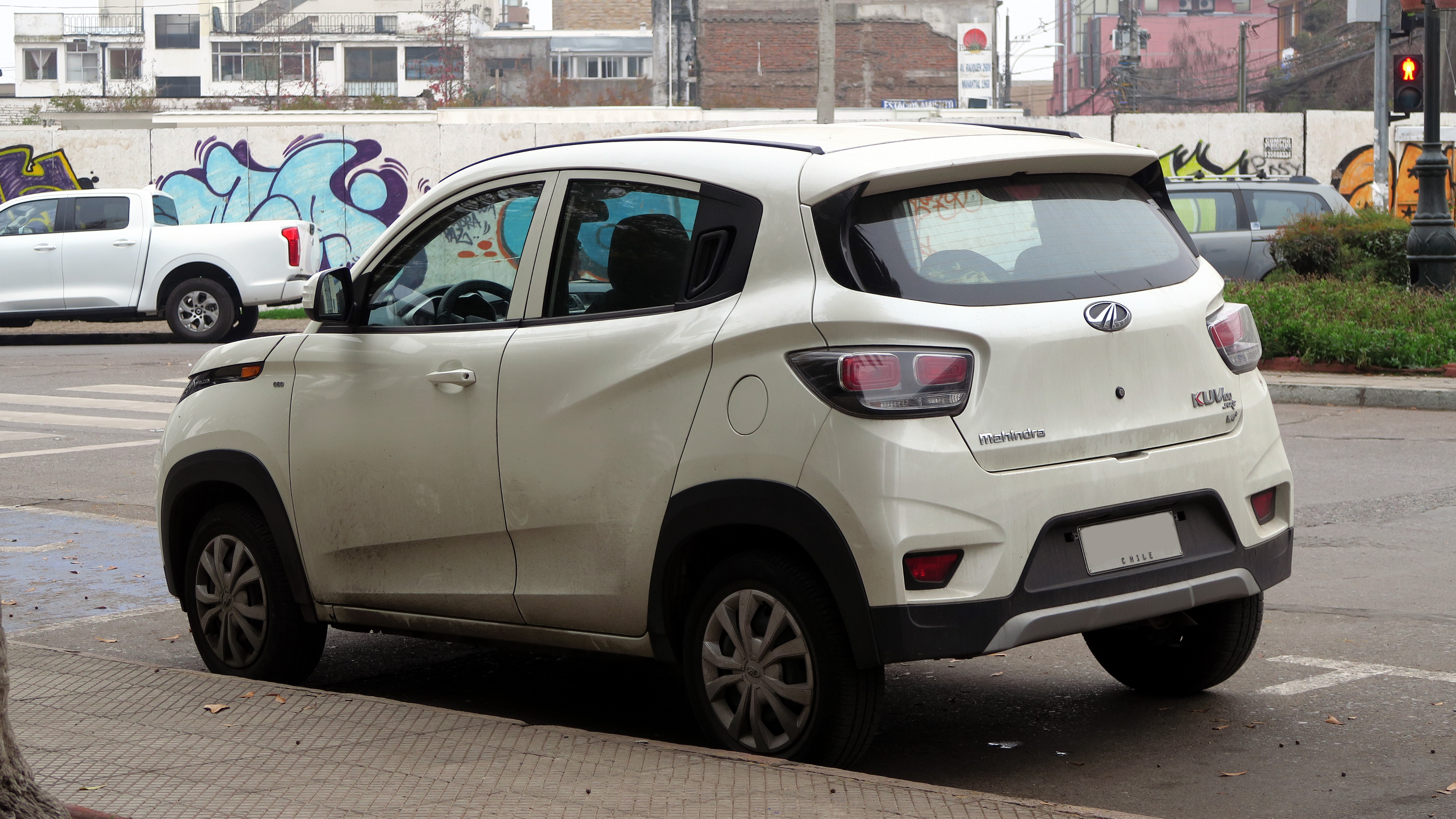
Facelift (rear)

== Engine ==
KUV100 uses Mahindra’s first-ever indigenously developed 1.2-litre 3-cylinder mFalcon G80, multi-point fuel injection (MPFI) with Dual Variable Valve Timing petrol engine with output of 61 kW (82 bhp) @ 5500 rpm of maximum power and 115 Nm @ 3500–3600 rpm of peak torque. It also promises to deliver a fuel consumption of 18.15 km/L.

Its diesel variant uses a 1.2-litre 3-cylinder mFalcon D75, turbocharger with intercooler, common rail Direct Injection technology engine. It is capable of delivering 57.4 kW (77 bhp) @ 3750 rpm of power and 190 Nm @ 1750–2250 rpm of torque with the help of a 5-speed manual gearbox. It is capable of delivering a fuel consumption of 25.32 km/L. Dimension-wise, it is identical to the petrol version and apart from the diesel motor no additional features are added.

== Safety ==
KUV standard features include dual front airbags for the safety of driver and co-driver, anti-lock braking system (ABS) with electronic brake-force distribution (EBD) and front seat belt pretensioners which ensure the safety of all its occupants. The other safety features are collapsible steering column, child safety locks on rear doors, speed sensing automatic door locks, automatic hazard warning lamps on panic braking or bonnet opening, automatic hazard warning lamps on crash, anti-theft security alarm, anti-slip clips for driver side floor mat, ISOFIX child seat mounts on rear seat.
