= Tractors in India =

Overview of Indian tractor industry

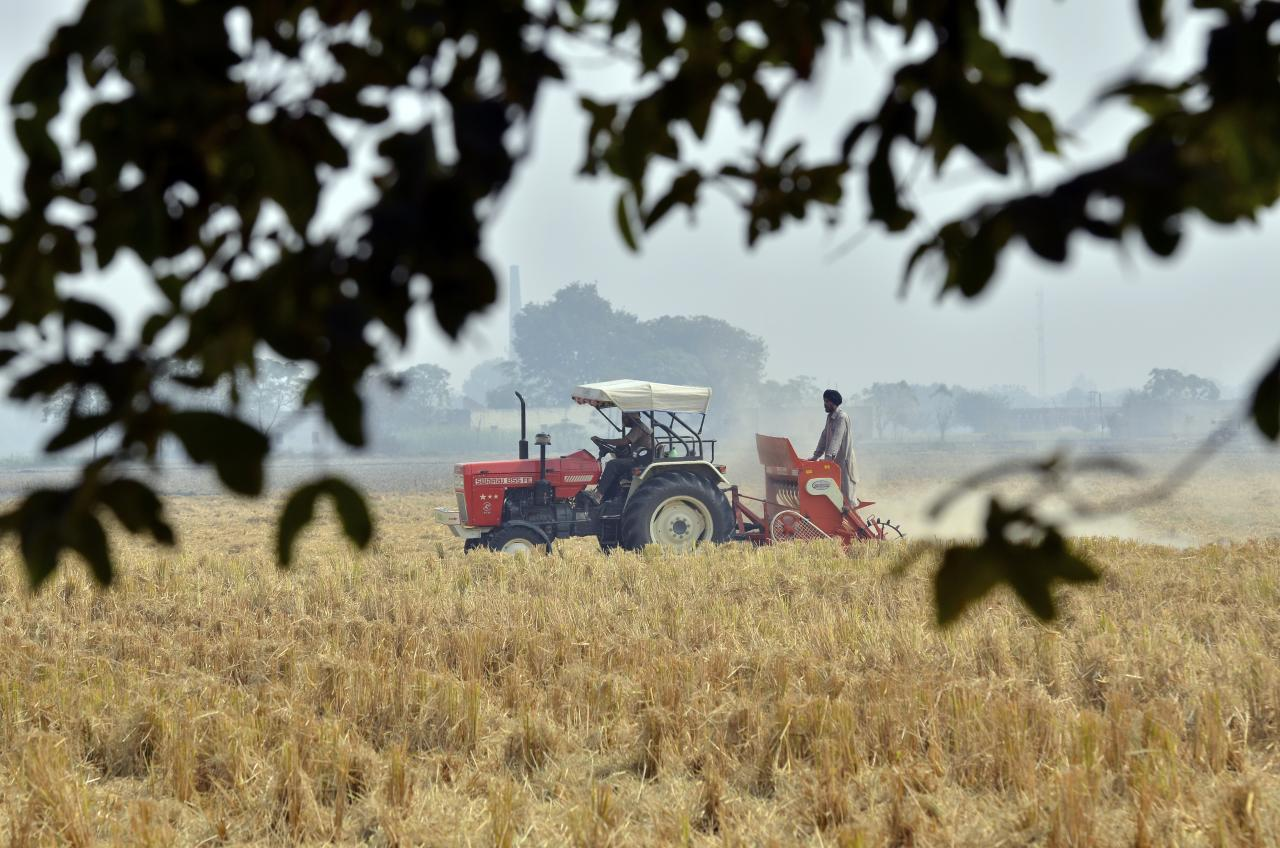
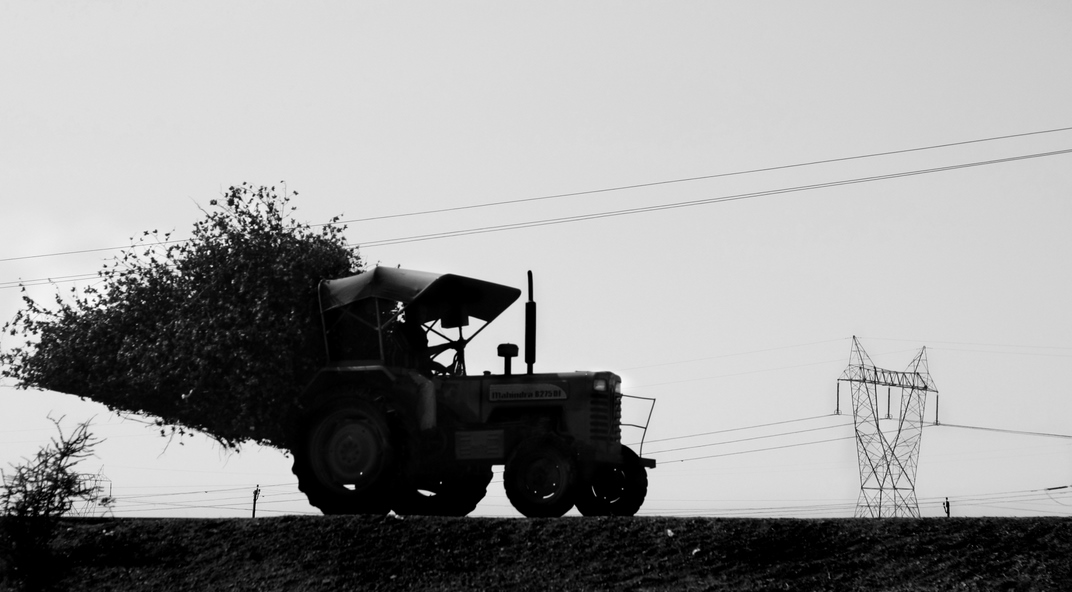
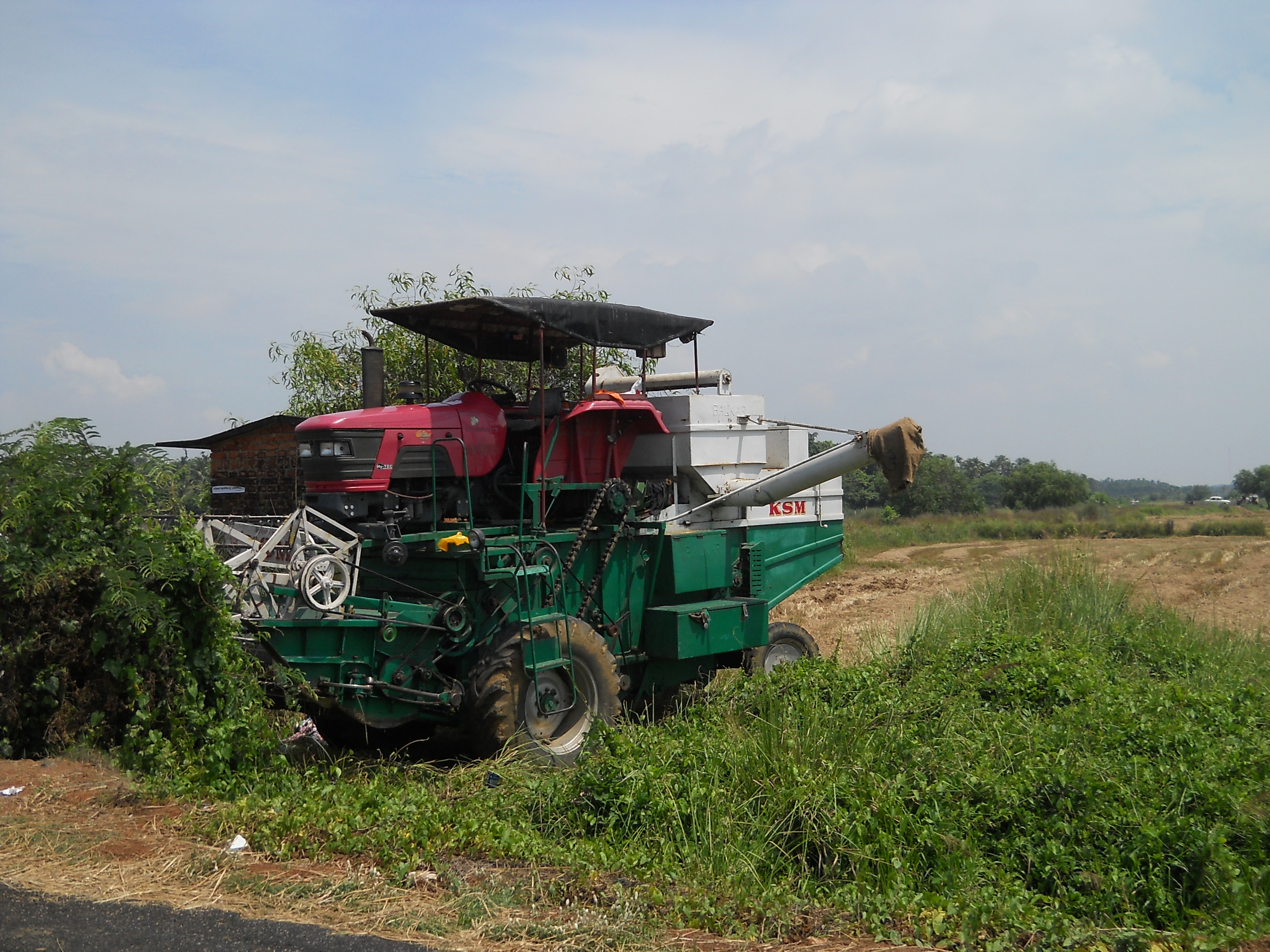
India is the world's largest manufacturer of tractors with 50% of world's output in 2016; it is also the world's largest tractor market. Above, tractors adapted for different functions in various parts of India.

Tractors in India are a major industry and significant contributor to its agriculture output gains.

In 1947, as India gained independence from the British Empire, the level of agriculture mechanisation was low. The socialist oriented five-year plans of the 1950s and 1960s aggressively promoted rural mechanisation via joint ventures and tie-ups between local industrialists and international tractor manufacturers. Despite these efforts, the first three decades after independence local production of 4-wheel tractors grew slowly. By the late 1980s tractor production was nearly 140,000 units per year, and a prevalence rate of less than 2 per 1,000 farmers.

After economic reforms of 1991, the pace of change increased and by late 1990s with production approached 270,000 per year. In early 2000s, India overtook the United States as the world's largest producer of four-wheel tractors. FAO estimated, in 1999, that of total agricultural area in India, less than 50% is under mechanised land preparation, indicating large opportunities still exist for agricultural mechanisation.

In 2013, India produced 619,000 tractors accounting for 29% of world's output, as the world's largest producer and market for tractors. India currently has 16 domestic and 4 multinational corporations manufacturing tractors.

== History ==
=== 1945 to 1960 ===
War surplus tractors and bulldozers were imported for land reclamation and cultivation in mid-1940s. In 1947 central and state tractor organisations were set up to develop and promote the supply and use of tractors in agriculture and up to 1960, the demand was met entirely through imports. There were 8,500 tractors in use in 1951, 20,000 in 1955 and 37,000 by 1960.In this period Massey Ferguson entered India With Massey Ferguson 35x and 135

=== 1960–1970 ===
By 1970 annual production had exceeded 20,000 units with over 146,000 units working in the country.

=== 1971 to 1980 ===
By late 1960s the government of India initiated the Green Revolution in India program and the need for mechanisation created more demands for farm tractors.To meet the initial demand the Government allowed lot of imports mostly from USSR and its Eastern Bloc neighbours. In addition six new manufacturers were established during this period although three companies (Kirloskar Tractors, Harsha Tractors and Pittie Tractors) did not survive. HMT, a large public sector unit, began manufacturing Agricultural Tractors in 1972 under the HMT brand name with technology acquired from Zetor of the Czech Republic (and in year 2016 this company was shut down by the government of India). Escorts Ltd. began local manufacture of Ford tractors in 1971 in collaboration with Ford, UK and total production climbed steadily to 33,000 in 1975–76

=== 1981 to 1990 ===
A further five manufacturers (Auto Tractors, Haryana Tractors, United Auto Tractors, Asian Tractors, and VST Tillers) began production during this period but only VST has survived in the increasingly competitive marketplace. Annual production exceeded 75,000 units by 1985 and reached 140,000 in 1990 when the total in use was about 1.2 million. Than India – a net importer up to the mid-seventies – became an exporter in the 1980s mainly to countries in Africa.

=== 1991 to 1997 ===
Since 1992, it has not been necessary to obtain an industrial license for tractor manufacture in India. By 1997 annual production exceeded 255,000 units and the national tractor population had passed the two million mark. India now emerged as one of the world leaders in wheeled tractor production.

=== 1997 to 1999 ===
Five new manufacturers started production in this period. In 1996 Sonalika Tractors started its first tractor manufacturing plant in Hosiarpur, then in 1998 Bajaj Tempo, later renamed Force Motors, began tractor production in Pune. In April of the same year New Holland Tractor (India) Ltd launched production of 70hp tractors with matching equipment by investing $US 75 million in a state-of-the-art plant at Greater Noida in Uttar Pradesh state with an initial capacity of 35000 units per year. Also during this time, Larsen and Toubro established a joint venture with John Deere of the United States, for the manufacture of 35–65 hp tractors at a plant in Pune, Maharashtra. And Greeves Ltd began producing tractors under similar arrangements with Deutz-Fahr of Italy. Captain Tractors has rolled out first indigenous Mini Tractor of 9.5hp for small and marginal farmers. CASE now Case IH looking to develop a joint venture in India went into discussions with various Indian companies and in 1999 settled with New Holland Pvt Ltd. India for manufacturing CASE brand tractors and harvesting equipment at New Holland's facility.

=== 1999 to present ===
Facing market saturation in the traditional markets of the north west (Punjab, Haryana, Western Uttar Pradesh) tractors sales began a slow and slight decline. By 2002 sales went below 200,000. Manufacturers expanded into eastern and southern India markets in an attempt to reverse the decline, and began exploring the potential for overseas markets.

In 2013, India produced 619,000 tractors accounting for 29% of world's output. It is the world's largest producer and market for tractors. India currently has 16 domestic and 4 multinational corporations manufacturing tractors. In 2014 Zetor come back in India and linked with the local tractor manufacture companies to supply 40 to 75 hp tractors on zetor brand name to other countries.

== Characteristics, prevalence and market share ==
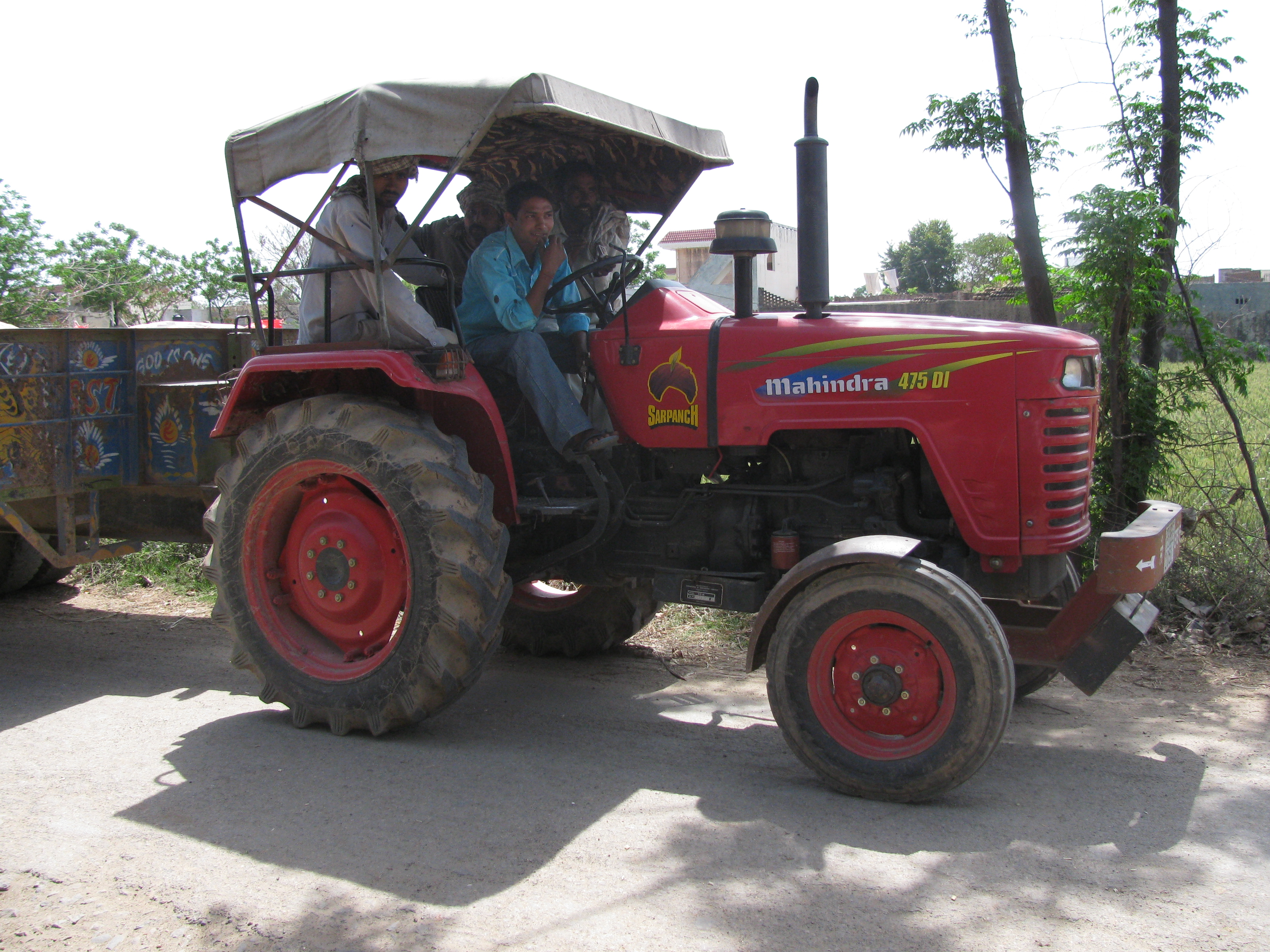
Mahindra tractor has the largest share of Indian tractor market.

- Market Characteristics:
  - Despite the growing availability and sales in the higher HP utility tractors in the category 2 (50–100 HP) and even in category 3 (100–180 HP) the average HP remains between 40 and 45 HP.
  - While the industry remains very competitive nationally and internationally and with ever increasing numbers of OEMs, the manufactures are offering quality improvements in engine efficiency and emissions, better selection in transmissions, power steering, etc., they have also managed to keep prices down by limiting offerings in digitalization (little or no use of engine control modules – ECM) of the engine-tractor, roll over protection systems as optional, and the other bells and whistles for operators that come as standard options elsewhere.
  - Very competitive and widely available repair services due in part to keeping things simple (no ECMs, etc.).
  - Sales are also driven as the "agricultural" tractors are widely used in providing commercial transport services in rural and peri-urban areas. The cost of a tractor and trailer are much less than the higher speed commercial truck offerings in the 1–5 ton sector.
- Prevalence:
  - Tractors are getting widespread acceptance in India.
  - Kotaks and ICRA reports estimate that nearly 4.3 million tractors were in operation, and 1 in 20 rural households owned a tractor in 2011. They project that the market will grow at 7% to 8% per year, and only 19% of Indian rural farming households that can afford a tractor have as yet purchased a unit.
  - Designs that allow multi-functional use, adapted to local needs and rural constraints, are experiencing higher demands.
- Market Share
  - Five companies account for over 80% of the market share
  - Mahindra and Mahindra (largest at 42.5% share)
  - TAFE with 20%
  - Rest
    - Escorts,
    - ITL-Sonalika
    - John Deere.

== Current manufacturers ==
=== ACE Tractors ===
Action Construction Equipment Limited (ACE) began manufacturing of Tractors in 2009 by launching two models in 35 / 45 HP categories. At present it is manufacturing 3 models by introducing 55 HP models in 2011. And also manufactured crains, harvester etc. In Oct.2013 ACE Tractors reached a milestone of selling 2000 tractors in India and Nepal. ACE has its manufacturing plants in Faridabad (Haryana), Kashipur/Bajpur (Uttrakhand).

=== Agri-King Tractors and Equipments Pvt. Ltd. ===
Established in 2010 at Majholi, Himachal Pradesh in Northern India, Agri King produces a few models of tractors, which seem to be based on Steyr Tractors or Basak tractors . The Agri King T44 40 HP model, Agri King T54 50 HP model, and Agri King 20–55 50 HP model with improved 24 speed synchro-mesh transmission. All feature Kirloskar engines.

=== Agrotrack ===
Pauniya Tractors And Farm Equipment was founded in 2018 by C.A. Singh. Their history says AGROTRACK Tractor India was looking for company to assemble their tractors in India, and selected Pauniya. They assemble a limited number of models utilizing Kirloskar engines.

=== Akash ===
Akash Equipments & Machineries Pvt, Ltd began building tractors in 2010. They are based in Faridabad, Haryana, and only assemble a few different low-horsepower models.

=== Apollo Tractors ===
Apollo Tractors – Fieldtrack Earthmovers Pvt. Ltd began in 2017 in Kadi, Mehsana, India. It is a small manufacturer.

=== AutoNXT ===
AutoNxt Automation began in 2022 in Kalher, Bhiwandi, Maharashtra, and is building electric tractors for the Indian market.

=== Captain Tractors Pvt. Ltd ===
Captain Tractors had been established in 1994 in Rajkot by joint efforts of two brothers Mr. G.T. Patel and Mr. M.T. Patel based from village Sanali dist. Amreli (Gujarat). Today Captain Tractors manufacture mini tractors from 15 to 30 HP.

=== Cellestial eMobility ===
Cellestial eMobility is another electric tractor manufacturer in India. They are based in Hyderabad.

=== Crossword Agro Industries ===
Located in Rajkot, India, Crossword manufactures small tractors under the Nissan, Atmak and Captain brand names. .

=== D.K. Champion ===
D.K. Diesels Pvt. Ltd was founded in 1998 and is based in the mini-tractor capital in India of Rajkot, Gujarat. They build mini-tractors up to smaller tractors, 10–28 hp.

=== Darsh ===
DarshTrek and Darsh Belarus began in 2022 as a part of Darsha, Erisha Agritech Private Ltd., division of Rana Group. Darsh Belarus tractors are assembled and manufactured under license from MTZ and is based in New Delhi. DarshTrek tractors include some built by Captain Tractors, some electric, and others.

=== Eicher ===
In 1949, Eicher GoodEarth, was set up in India with technical collaboration with Gebr. Eicher of Germany, imported and sold about 1500 tractors in India. On 24 April 1959 Eicher came out with the first locally assembled tractor from its Faridabad factory and in a period from 1965 to 1974 became the first fully manufactured (100% indigenisation) tractor in India. In December 1987 Eicher Tractors went public and in June 2005 Eicher Motors Limited sold Eicher Tractors & Engines to a subsidiary of TAFE called TAFE Motors and Tractors Limited.

Eicher also produced tractors under the Euro Power and Eicher Valtra brands under license from Valtra, an AGCO brand.

=== Escorts ===
Escorts began local manufacture of Ford tractors in 1971 in collaboration with Ford, UK and total production climbed steadily to 33,000 in 1975, reaching 71,000 by 1980. Ford (Ford – New Holland) was sold in 1992. Ford Motor Company proper quit the tractors business, but the name was allowed to continue as per agreement until 2000, when Escorts relabelled its Ford models under the Escort brand. Escort manufactures produces construction and agriculture tractors in the 8-75 HP range and has already sold over 600,000 tractors. Its tractors are marketed under three brand names, Escort, Powertrac and Farmtrac.

In 2020 Kubota acquired 10% of Escorts, and is selling 40% of Kubota Agricultural Machinery India (KAI) to Escorts. In 2022, the ag company was renamed Escorts-Kubota Ltd, and tractors are also marketed under the Escorts-Kubota brand.

=== Farmer Tractor ===
Based in Rajkot, Gujarat, Farmer Tractor is focused on the production the Farmer Tractor DI 1200, using a Greaves four stroke, direct injection, 12 HP diesel engine.

=== HAV ===
HAV, or Hybrid Agri Vehicle, is a hybrid-engine tractor manufacturer based in Noida, Uttar Pradesh. Founded in 2020, they manufacture diesel & CNG – electric hybrid tractors.

=== Hercules tractors ===
Swift Auto Engg Solutions Pvt. Ltd manufacture the Hercules brand of tractors in India. It is based in Ballabhgarh, Haryana.

=== HMT Tractors ===
HMT is a large public sector unit and began manufacturing Agricultural Tractors in 1972 under the HMT brand name with technology acquired from Zetor of the Czech Republic. It manufactures its tractors in Pinjore, Panchkula in a large factory that also manufactures machine-tools, and Hyderabad It has a capacity of 20,000 tractors per annum. In the Machine-tool company is a large foundry. It produces tractors in a range from 25 HP to 75 HP. HMT has also exported tractors to the USA under the Zebra brand, which were marketed by Zetor distributors and dealers there. The company is controlled by the Ministry of Heavy industry that provides to the public its financial performance. Now the company is permanently closed.

=== HNT ===
HNT Pvt. Ltd (Hoshiar Nirvair Tractors Pvt Ltd) was founded in 2012 in Una, Himachal Pradesh. They manufacturer a range of tractors from 35 hp up to 75 hp.

=== Indo Farm ===
Indo Farm commenced commercial production of tractors in October 2000 at its plant located at Baddi in District Solan, Himachal Pradesh with technology acquired from Ursus of the Poland. Spread over an area of 34 acres, the plant started with the production of a single model. Within a decade of successful operations Indo Farm grew to a company having models in the range of 30 HP, 38 HP, 42 HP, 48 HP, 50 HP, 52 HP, 55 HP, 60 HP, 65 HP, 75 HP and 90 HP with many variants. Within a year of its operations, the company had successfully indigenized the engine components, manufacturing and assembly processes, and accordingly stopped import of engines. In 2008, the company diversified into manufacturing and marketing of Pick-N-Carry cranes of 9 tonnes – 20 tonnes capacity and has recently commenced production of mobile tower cranes too. It is now making engines for generator sets that are exported overseas.

=== John Deere ===
In 2000, John Deere set up production in a joint venture with Larsen & Toubro Ltd in Sanaswadi, in a rural area near Pune, Maharashtra. It was known as L&T John Deere Private Ltd, and manufactured tractors under the L&T – John Deere name for sale in India, and under the John Deere name for worldwide sales.

In 2005, Deere & Company acquired nearly all the remaining shares in this joint venture. The new enterprise, is known as John Deere Equipment Private Limited. The factory currently produces tractors in of 35, 38, 40, 42,45, 50, 55, 65, 75 and 89 HP capacities for domestic markets and for export to the US, Mexico, Turkey, North and South Africa, and South East Asia. Pune factory started to produce new 55 to 75 Hp 5003 series tractors for European market in 2008.

John Deere India Private Limited is a subsidiary of Deere & Company, USA in India. Its factory, located at Sanaswadi, Pune, manufactures 5000 Series agricultural tractors. The Indian operations of Deere & Company include a technology center located at Magarpatta City Pune, John Deere Dewas (Indore MP) works, Jon Deere PDC Nagpur (MH) and John Deere Water Vadodara. The technology center provides services in the areas of Information technology, engineering, supply management, embedded systems and technical authoring for company's operations worldwide. John Deere Water, formed by the acquisitions of Plastro Irrigation Systems, T-Systems International, and Roberts Irrigation Products.

=== Mahindra Gujarat Tractor Limited (MGTL) ===
The company popularly known as Gujarat Tractors and its popular 60 hp model Hindustan 60 was established in 1959 as Tractors and Bulldozers Private Ltd and imported tractors. Manufacturing began in 1963, in collaboration Motokov-Praha (Zetor) of Czechoslovakia, and was known as Hindustan Tractors & Bulldozers Ltd. In 1967, it became Hindustan Tractors Ltd. The tractors were based on the Zetor tractor design and sold under the Hindustan brand. In 1978, the Gujarat, Indian government formed [ Gujarat Tractors] from the ailing company. In 1999, Mahindra Tractors purchased 60% of the company, and in 2001, completed purchasing the rest of the company, renaming it Mahindra Gujarat Tractors Ltd thus becoming part of Mahindra Group. The company is engaged in manufacturing of tractors in a range of 30–60 hp which are marketed under Farmplus and Shaktimaan brand.

Mahindra Gujarat Tractor Limited (MGTL) has its Head Office at Vadodara. MGTL is an ISO 9001:2008 and OHSAS18001:2007 certified company. The company has 13 area offices and around 225 dealers.

In 2017, Mahindra Gujarat was renamed Gromax Agri Equipment (GAEL), and is using Trakstar as its tractor brand.

=== Mahindra Tractors ===
Mahindra Tractors is an international farm equipment manufacturer of Mahindra & Mahindra. In 2010, Mahindra became the largest selling tractor in the world. Mahindra's largest consumer base is in India, but with sales also focusing on China, North America and a growing base in Australia. The company is the largest manufacturer with about 25% of the market in India and has the capacity to build 150,000 tractors a year.

In 1963, M&M formed a joint venture with International Harvester to manufacture tractors carrying the Mahindra nameplate for the Indian market. Mahindra purchased the rights from International Harvester to manufacture their British designed International B-275 model which was also sold in USA as McCormick International. Mahindra Tractors sold about 85,000 units annually making it one of the largest tractor producers in the world.[5] To expand into the growing tractor market in China, Mahindra acquired majority stake in Jiangling.

Its sales in Gujarat are under the label Mahindra Gujarat and its sales in Punjab are under the label Swaraj. In 1999, Mahindra purchased 100% of Gujarat Tractors from the Government of Gujarat ??[9] and Mahindra purchased a 64.6% stake in Swaraj in 2004.

Mahindra Tractors started manufacturing 15HP tractor under the brand name Yuvraj in Rajkot in 2011. The plant in Rajkot is set up jointly by Deepak Diesel Pvt Ltd and Mahindra & Mahindra. The plant has a maximum capacity of 30000 tractors per year.

=== Mars Group ===
Originally established in 1976, the MARS Group is engaged in manufacturing/marketing of dump trucks, loaders, foggers, and agricultural tractors and attachments. Based in Lucknow, U.P., it began manufacturing two mini-tractor models under the Marshal name in 2005, Captain DI 2600 of 25 HP and Trishul MT DI 625 10 HP.

=== New Holland Agriculture ===
New Holland Ag's entry into India was facilitated by FIAT's acquisition of Ford-New Holland in 1991. By 1998 New Holland Ag. (India) completed the construction of a new plant in Noida, near New Delhi, with a capacity of 5000 tractors in the 35–75 hp range. In 1999, New Holland Ag's parent company FIAT bought 70% of holdings of Case Corporation and created Case New Holland Global (CNH one of the top three tractor/agricultural/construction machinery manufacturers in the world), the new holding company for New Holland Ag. (India). In 2000, the capacity of the Noida plant rose to 12,000 tractors per year and in 2007 the company manufactured 24,000 tractors for the domestic and export markets. New Holland India exports fully built tractors to 51 countries in Africa, Australia, South-East Asia, West Asia, North America and Latin America. The India plant of New Holland was originally built in 1998 to cater only to India domestic market. However, due to slow down of economy by year 2001–2002 and slump in domestic demand, it became a challenge to utilize the installed capacity of the factory. Hence the company started looking its market beyond India borders. By 2007 New Holland had increased its exports to 8000 units and was contributing over 50% of the company business. In 2007, this also made New Holland the second largest tractor exporter from India after John Deere.

=== Preet Tractors ===
Entrepreneur Hari Singh and his brother Gurcharan Singh laid the foundation of "Preet Agro Industries back in 1980 when they began initial production of straw reapers, threshers and other agricultural implements. The two launched their first tractor driven combine harvester in 1986. With a successful line of combine harvesters under their belt they began research and development for a tractor that led to their first and best known model "987". With excellent reliability and performance Preet continues to make remarkable impact not only in Indian farming community and other countries across the world. Preet's manufacturing plant Patiala, Punjab, spanning 50,000 sq meters is producing low cost ad quality tractors offered in a range of 35 HP to 90 HP. Similarly the Combine harvesters are offered in 75 HP and 110 HP for multiple crops, including paddy, wheat, etc.

In 2022, Preet began marketing their tractors overseas using the Avenger brand.

=== SAME Deutz-Fahr (India) Private Ltd. ===
In 1996, SAME DEUTZ-FAHR set up production in a joint venture with Greaves Ltd in Ranipet, Tamil Nadu. It was known as SAME GREAVES TRACTOR Ltd, and manufactured tractors under the name SAME-Greaves for sale in India. In 2002, SAME DEUTZ-FAHR acquired nearly all the remaining shares in this joint venture. The new enterprise is known as SAME DEUTZ-FAHR India Private Ltd. The factory currently produces tractors in of 35 to 120HP capacities and Engines from 35 to 160 HP for domestic markets and International Markets.

SAME DEUTZ-FAHR (SDF) India Private Limited a subsidiary of SDF Group Italy since 2002. The Group manufacturers and sells tractor across the globe through its major brands SAME, Deutz-Fahr, Lamborghini, Hurlimann and Gregoire. SDF India sells its tractors in India through its brand Deutz-Fahr and the product range includes tractors from 35–80HP. SDF India has an established network of 220+ dealerships with service centres across India.

=== Solis Tractors (Solis-Yanmar) ===
In 2011 a joint venture between Yanmar Co. Ltd. and ITL (Sonalika-International Tractors Limited) was formed in to manufacture and market tractors in India and for export markets under the "Solis Yanmar" brand name. In the past, this company has built tractors for Claas and Renault, among others. Today it collaborates with the Japanese Yanmar and produces tractors for Landini. With a production of 120,000 units per year, Sonalika is one of the largest tractor manufacturers in the world. The Sonalika Group is an Indian multinational company headquartered in Hoshiarpur, India. Solis offers a wide range of 2 and 4-wheel drive tractors from 30 HP (model 3016 SN) to 75 HP (7524 S).

=== Sonalika ===
International Tractors Limited was incorporated on 17 October 1987 and began manufacturing tractors designed by Central Mechanical Engineering Research Institute (CMERI). I. In 2000 ITL entered into a tie up with Renault Agricultural of France and began manufacturing Sonalika tractors. Sonalika is currently manufacturing models between 18 HP to 120 HP, and as well as the Renault CERES brand between 60HP to 90HP. In 2005 Yanmar bought a 13 per cent stake in the company and began lifted production to 200 tractors per day. In 2013 the world's largest private investment company US based BlackRock purchased approximately 13% stake in ITL with the remaining 70 owned by founder Lachhman Das Mittal. In 2016 Yanmar purchased BlackRock's stake, bringing their stake to approximately 30%. In 2017 Sonalika began manufacturing Zetor Global brand tractors for Zetor.

Sonalika International tractors Ltd. is the youngest and the third largest tractor maker in India. Its integrated tractor manufacturing plant at Hoshiarpur has a capacity to produce 3 lakh units per annum. The company produces tractors in a range from 20HP to 120HP and has presence in more than 80 countries. Sonalika ITL has been recently felicitated by The Economic Times publication as an 'Iconic Brand of India'.

=== Standard Combine ===
Standard Combine began building tractors in Barnala, Punjab, India. In Standard Tractors, tractors are being manufactured in the range of 35, 45, 50, 60, and 75 HP with respective model names: Standard 335, Standard 345, Standard 450, Standard 460, and Standard 475. Engines for all these tractor models, except the last one, are manufactured within the plant as 'Standard Engines', in specific names – SE 335, SE 345, SE 450 and SE 460, respectively. All the above-mentioned models of Standard Engines have shown compliance to the TREM-III emission norms, as have been verified by the ARAI. However, two new variants of tractor of 35 hp (Standard 335-I) and 45 hp (Standard 345-I), equipped with famous Perkins engines (assembled within the Standard Tractors plant), and two completely new models of tractor of 30 hp (Standard 330) and 40 hp (Standard 340) are on the verge to be launched. Besides these, three 3-wheelers (two passenger-carriers and one cargo), one 4-wheeler (cargo), a crane, an electric 3-wheeled mini-car, and two 2-wheelers (scooters) are either in the process of development or on the verge of launch from the Standard Tractor Division.

=== Swaraj Tractors ===
In the mid-sixties, with the Green Revolution triggering large-scale tractor usage, there was a need for the country to build sufficient indigenous capacity to meet this growing demand.

In 1965, the Central Mechanical Engineering Research Institute (CMERI), Durgapur initiated design and development of Swaraj Tractor based on indigenous know how. That is how the idea for development of what was to become Swaraj was initiated. The first prototype was ready in May 1967 and by April 1970, field experience of over 1,500 hours had been gained. At that point, it was decided to christen a name for the product – signifying Indian, easy to pronounce and signifying power and grace. The name 'Swaraj', was approved by the then Prime Minister, Mrs Indira Gandhi.

In 1970, the Government of Punjab acquired the Swaraj tractor's design and established Punjab Tractors Limited (PTL). The tractors were produced and sold under the brand name of Swaraj. In 2007, Mahindra & Mahindra Ltd. acquired majority stake in PTL, and in Feb 2009, it was merged into M&M as the Swaraj Division of Mahindra & Mahindra.

=== TAFE ===
Tractors and Farm Equipment Limited (TAFE) is the second largest tractor manufacturer in India. The company established in 1961 to manufacture and market Massey Ferguson tractors and related farm equipment in India. It is part of Amalgamations Group based in Chennai with Mallika Srinivasan as the chairman of the company.AGCO also owns 24% stake in TAFE. Tractors are built and sold in India under both the TAFE and Massey Ferguson brands, and exported under both brands as well. In 2005, TAFE bought the Eicher Motors tractor and engine division.

=== Traclaxx Tractors ===
Traclaxx Tractors Pvt. Ltd , formerly Forcetrac Tractors Private Limited was founded in 2014 in Ludhiana, Punjab by Darpan Dadu. They are a small volume, low horsepower tractor manufacturer and is part of BAX Intl. They may not still be in business as of 2023.

=== VST Tillers ===
VST Tillers was set up in 1967 in Bangalore, India. In collaboration with Mitsubishi Agricultural Machinery of Japan, they manufacture 18HP tractors under various brands, including Mitsubishi-Shakti, Shakti, Eurotrac-VST and Euro-Trac. They have been exported to Asia, the Middle East, Europe and the USA. In 2020, VST and Zetor set up a joint venture to manufacture tractors in India under the VST-Zetor brand.

== Previous Indian tractor companies ==
Tractor companies that did not survive and were not acquired by other companies are:

=== Auto Tractors Ltd., Pratapgarh ===
Established in 1979, Auto Tractors Ltd. (ATL) had a manufacturing plant at Pratapgarh, Uttar Pradesh, and were making tractors with 28 bhp (21 kW) Leyland engines. It was established with 40% state money and the remainder an IDBI Bank loan. Production began in September 1981, but with severe supply problems and an outmoded product they only produced 2,380 tractors in their nearly ten years of existence. This was less than the projected production for the first two years alone. The company and assets were sold to automaker Sipani in 1991, who focused on producing diesel tractor engines (at over five times the rate of ATL themselves) but built some tractors as well.

After having been liquidated, the last of the company assets were offered for sale by the Uttar Pradesh state government in 2008.

=== Asian Tractors Ltd ===
Began building tractors in 1989 from their own designs.

=== Ford Tractors ===
Ford (formerly Ford Tractor Division) began producing Ford Tractors in India in 1972 with a tie up with Escorts. In 1986 Ford acquired New Holland and tractor operations was transferred to Ford-New Holland and made into an independent corporation. In 1991, Fiat began an arranged purchase of Ford-New Holland that was completed in 1993, ending Ford Motor Company's long history of tractor production. The deal required that New Holland/FIAT stop using the Ford name. New Holland India Pvt Ltd began production of tractors in India in 1998.

=== Harsha Tractors ===
In 1975, Harsha Tractors Ltd began manufacturing tractors in conjunction with Motoimport of Russia. Tractor production never amounted to much, and has since ceased.

=== Haryana Tractors Ltd ===
As a part of Pratap Steel Rolling Mills Ltd., Haryana began building tractors from their own designs in 1983.

=== Kirloskar Tractors ===
Founded in co-operation with Deutz-Fahr of Germany in 1974. It has since ceased to manufacture tractors. However, the company continues to manufacture engines under license from Deutz.

=== Pittie Tractors ===
Pittie Tractors was set up by a young and dynamic engineer – Shrikant Pittie and started out as Pittie Tools. The Pittie family are prominent industrialists in Pune and the family set up the first private industry in Pune – The Raja Bahadur Motilal Poona Mills Ltd. in 1893. Pittie Tractors indigenously developed and manufactured tractors and was well set to capture a large share of the market in India. However, due to an unfortunate labour strike at one of its critical vendors, followed by a similar strike at its own plant, the company lost nearly a year of production. As a result, the company fell into financial difficulty and ultimately had to wind-up operations.

=== United Auto Tractors Ltd. ===
Began in 1986 in conjunction with Uzina Tractorul of Romania.

== Tractor Manufacturers Association ==
The Tractor Manufacturers' Association of India (TMA) is housed under The Confederation of Indian Industry (CII), New Delhi. Though not all manufacturers are members TMA is recognised as the main trade group representing the agricultural tractor industry in India. TR Kesavan, COO – Product Strategy and Corporate Relations, TAFE – Tractors and Farm Equipment Limited is the current President of TMA.

== See also ==
- List of tractor manufacturers – worldwide list
- List of former tractor manufacturers – worldwide list
