= Abhishek Kumar Pandey =

Indian educationist and organisational director

Abhishek Pandey
- Occupations: Educationist, Director
- Organization: Charles Walters Council for Innovation and Research
- Known for: Innovation and Educational Development
- Office: Director, CWCIR
- Website: www.cwsir.org

Abhishek Pandey is an Indian educationist and organisational director. He serves as the director of the Charles Walters Council for Innovation and Research and convenor of the Honour of Ashoka Award.

== See also ==
- Charles Walters Council for Innovation and Research
- Honour of Ashoka Award
