= Council of Scientific and Industrial Research =

Indian Scientific Research and Development Organization

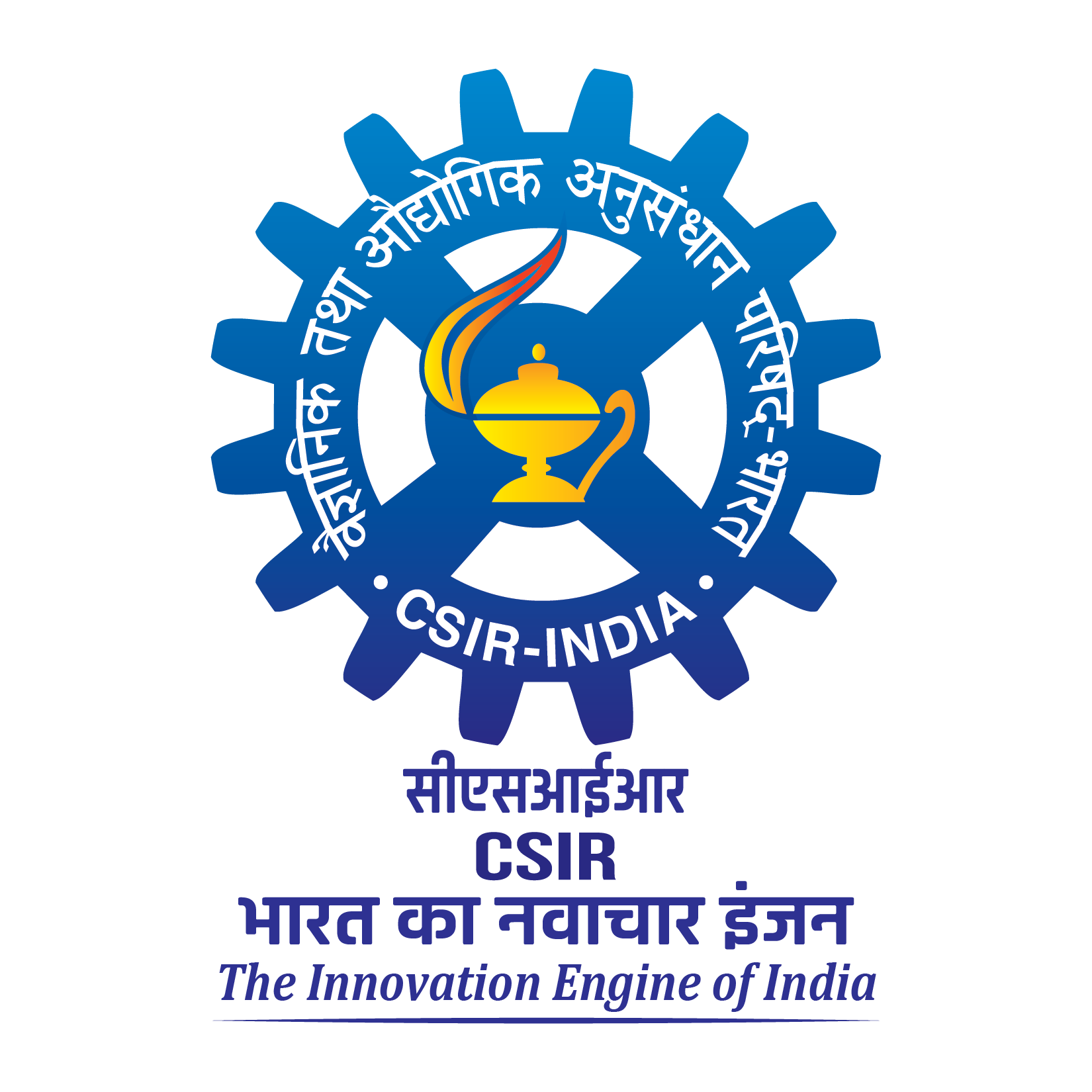
- Parent institution: Ministry of Science and Technology
- Founders: Arcot Ramasamy Mudaliar; Shanti Swaroop Bhatnagar
- Established: 26 September 1942; 84 years ago
- President: Prime Minister of India
- Director General: Nallathamby Kalaiselvi
- Budget: ₹7,144 crore (US$760 million) (2021–22)
- Address: Anusandhan Bhawan; 2 Rafi Marg, New Delhi – 110001
- Location: New Delhi
- Website: csir.res.in

The Council of Scientific and Industrial Research (CSIR; IAST: vaigyanik tathā audyogik anusandhāna pariṣada) is a research and development (R&D) organisation in India to promote scientific, industrial and economic growth. Headquartered in New Delhi, it was established as an autonomous body in 1942 under the aegis of the Department of Scientific and Industrial Research (DSIR), Ministry of Science and Technology, Government of India. CSIR is among the largest publicly funded R&D organisations in the world. CSIR has pioneered sustained contribution to science and technology (S&T) human resource development in India.

As of 2013, it runs 37 laboratories/institutes, 39 outreach centres, 3 Innovation Centres and 5 units throughout the nation, with a collective staff of over 14,000, including a total of 4,600 scientists and 8,000 technical and support personnel. Although it is mainly funded by the Ministry of Science and Technology, it operates as an autonomous body through the Societies Registration Act, 1860.

The research and development activities of CSIR include aerospace engineering, structural engineering, ocean sciences, life sciences and healthcare including diagnostics, metallurgy, chemicals, mining, food, petroleum, leather, and environmental science.

N. Kalaiselvi is the present Director General of CSIR. She also serves as the Secretary of Department of Scientific and Industrial Research (DSIR), Ministry of Science and Technology, Government of India.

In terms of Intellectual property, CSIR has 2971 patents in force internationally and 1592 patents in force in India. CSIR is granted more than 14000 patents worldwide since its inception. CSIR was awarded the National Intellectual Property (IP) Award 2018 in the category "Top R&D Institution / Organisation for Patents and Commercialisation" by Indian Patent Office.

In late 2007, the Minister of Science and Technology, Kapil Sibal stated, in a Question Hour session of the Parliament, that CSIR has developed 1,376 technologies/knowledgebase during the last decade of the 20th century.

== History ==
In the 1930s, the need for establishing research organisations for the development of natural resources and new industries in India began to emerge. Eminent citizens such as C. V. Raman, Lt. Col. Seymour Sewell and J. C. Ghosh had proposed the creation of an advisory board of scientific research. Sir Richard Gregory, then editor of Nature, was among the first people who officially reported to the British Government. After visiting scientific departments and universities in India in 1933, Gregory submitted to Samuel Hoare, Secretary of State for India, regarding the need of scientific organisation similar to the DSIR in Britain. Indian scientists at Calcutta and Bangalore initiated schemes to launch a National Institute of Sciences and an Indian Academy of Sciences, respectively. At the Fifth Industries Conference in 1933, the Provincial Governments of Bombay, Madras, Bihar and Orissa unanimously reiterated their demand for a co-ordinating forum for industrial research. Hoare advised the Viceroy, Lord Willingdon, to support the demand. However, in May 1934, Willingdon replied to Hoare saying, "The creation of a Department of Scientific and Industrial Research in India to promote the application of research to natural resources does not appear to be necessary." While the Indian DSIR was rejected, the colonial government provided a small concession. It instead offered to create an Industrial Intelligence and Research Bureau, which came into operation in April 1935 under the Indian Stores Department. The Bureau's limited resources (with a budget of ₹1.0 lakh per annum) made it impossible to initiate major research and industrial activities as had been hoped for; it was mainly concerned with testing and quality control.

At the onset of World War II in 1939, the bureau was proposed to be abolished. Arguably, Arcot Ramasamy Mudaliar became the most instrumental in the creation of CSIR in India. As a member of Viceroy's executive council, and also of Commerce, he recommended that the Bureau should be terminated, not as a measure of economy, but to make room for a Board of Scientific and Industrial Research, which should be endowed with greater resources and wider objectives. It was by this persistence that the Board of Scientific and Industrial Research (BSIR) was created on 1 April 1940 for a period of two years. Mudaliar became the chair of the board. It was at this point that Bhatnagar was appointed to pilot the board, as the Director. The BSIR was allocated an annual budget of ₹5,00,000 under the Department of Commerce. By the end of 1940, about 80 researchers were engaged, of whom one-quarter was directly employed. Major achievements of BSIR included development of the techniques for the purification of Baluchistan sulphur anti-gas cloth manufacture, vegetable oil blends as fuel and lubricants, plastic packing cases for army boots and ammunition, dyes for uniforms and the preparation of vitamins, and the invention of a pyrethrum emulsifier and cream. In early 1941 Bhatnagar persuaded the government to set up an Industrial Research Utilisation Committee (IRUC) for translating results into application. The government then agreed to make a separate fund out of the royalties received from industry for further investment into industrial research. Mudaliar recommended that an Industrial Research Fund should be constituted, which would have an annual grant of ₹10,00,000 for a period of five years. This was accepted by the Central Assembly in Delhi at its session on 14 November 1941.

Then the constitution of the Council of Scientific and Industrial Research (CSIR) as an autonomous body was prepared under Mudaliar and Bhatnagar. Thus, CSIR came into operation on 26 September 1942. The BSIR and IRUC were incorporated into the advisory bodies to the governing body of the CSIR. In 1943 the governing body of CSIR approved the proposal of Bhatnagar to establish five national laboratories — the National Chemical Laboratory, the National Physical Laboratory, the Fuel Research Station, the Glass & Ceramics Research Institute and the National Metallurgical Laboratory. In 1944 in addition to its annual budget of ₹10 lakh, CSIR received a grant of ₹1 crore for the establishment of these laboratories. The Tata Industrial House donated ₹20 lakh for the chemical, metallurgical and fuel research laboratories. The foundation for the Central Glass and Ceramic Research Institute at Kolkata was the first to be laid, in December 1945; National Metallurgical Laboratory at Jamshedpur in November 1946; and that for the National Chemical Laboratory at Pune was the last, on 6 April 1947, four months before India became independent. All the five establishments were completed by 1950.

== Organisation Structure ==
1. President: Prime Minister (Ex-Officio)
2. Vice President: Minister of Science & Technology, India (Ex-Officio)
3. Governing Body: The Director General is the head of the governing body. The other ex-officio member is the finance secretary (expenditures). Other members' terms are three years.
4. CSIR Advisory Board: 15-member body composed of prominent members from respective fields of science and technology. Its function is to provide S&T inputs to the governing body. Member terms are three years.

== CSIR achievements ==
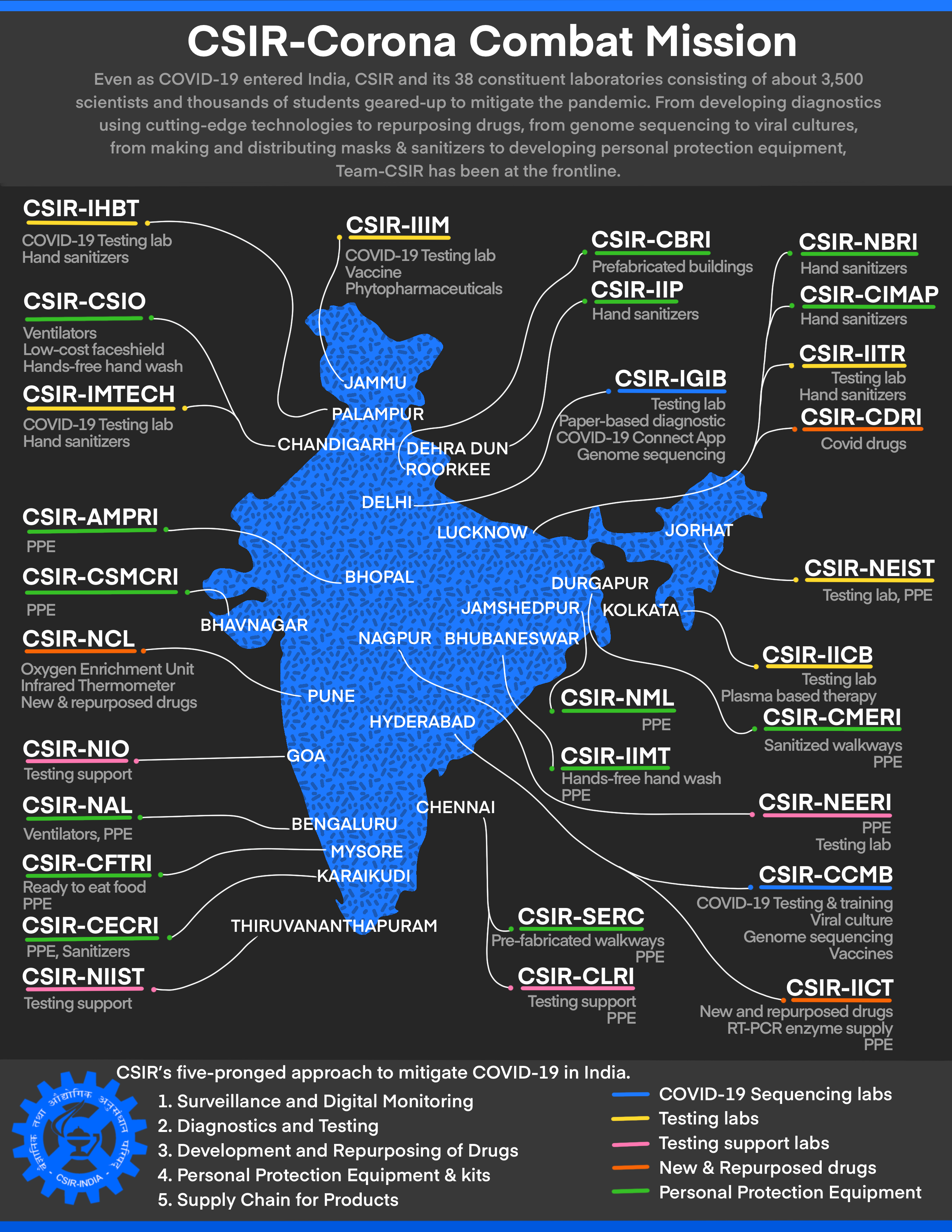
A poster showing CSIR's combat mission against COVID-19

- Developed India's first synthetic drug, methaqualone in 1950.
- Developed Optical Glass at CGCRI for defence purposes.
- Developed first Indian tractor Swaraj in 1967 completely based on indigenous know-how.
- Achieved the first breakthrough of flowering of Bamboo within weeks as against twenty years in nature.
- First to analyse genetic diversity of the indigenous Andamanese tribes and to establish their origin out of Africa 60,000 years ago.
- In 1987, developed the most popular tractor of India, named as Sonalika, being manufactured by International Tractors Limited.
- Developed the first transgenic Drosophila model for drug screening for cancer in humans.
- Invented, once a week non-steroidal family planning pill Saheli and non-steroidal herbal pill for asthma called Asmon.
- Designed India's first ever parallel processing computer, Flosolver.
- Rejuvenated India's one-hundred-year-old refinery at Digboi using the most modern molecular distillation technology.
- With TCS, developed a versatile portable PC-based software 'Bio-Suite' for bioinformatics.
- Design of 14 seater plane 'SARAS'.
- Established first ever in the world 'Traditional Knowledge Digital Library' accessible in five international languages, English, German, French, Japanese and Spanish.
- Successfully challenged the grant of patent in the US for use of haldi (turmeric) for wound healing and neem as insecticide.
- In 2007, under the NMITLI program, began the study of Sepsivac, a drug for gram-negative sepsis.
- In 2009, completed the sequencing of the Human Genome.
- In 2011, successfully tested India's 1st indigenous civilian aircraft, NAL NM5 made in association with National Aerospace Laboratories and Mahindra Aerospace.
- In 2020, initiated clinical trials to evaluate Sepsivac's efficacy to reduce mortality rate in COVID-19 patients.

== Shanti Swarup Bhatnagar Prize ==
The Shanti Swarup Bhatnagar Prize was established by CSIR in 1958. The prize is named after the Founder Director Shanti Swarup Bhatnagar.

The nominees for the award are filtered out from the research categories of - Biological Sciences, Chemical Sciences, Earth Sciences, Atmosphere, Ocean and Planetary, Engineering, Mathematical Sciences, Medical Sciences & Physical Sciences.

The Shanti Swarup Bhatnagar Prize comes up with a Citation, a Plaque & a Cash Award of 5 Lakh Rupees with the addition of a stipend of ₹15,000/- per month (till the age of 65).

Every year, the Award Selection Committee of CSIR presents the award to maximum 2 individuals from each research category. As per the stats, the SSB Prize has been awarded to 525 individuals for their exemplary work in Science & Technology.

The candidates must be:

- Indian Nationality
- Overseas citizen of India (OCI) and Persons of Indian Origin (PIO) working in India
- The awardee must have made conspicuously important and outstanding contributions to human knowledge and progress – fundamental and applied – in the field of endeavour, which is his/her specialisation.
- Upper Age Limit – 45 years.

The above criteria help CSIR Committee to select the eligible candidates for the award but the selection will be based on the results of selection procedure which is conducted by the Advisory Committee of CSIR.

== Research laboratories under CSIR ==
As of May 2024, there are 39 research laboratories, 39 outreach centres, 1 Innovation Complexes, and three units with a pan-India presence under CSIR in India.

Laboratory	State	City	Year Established
AMPRI - Advanced Materials and Processes Research Institute	Madhya Pradesh	Bhopal	1982
4PI - CSIR Fourth Paradigm Institute	Karnataka	Bengaluru	1988
CBRI - CSIR-Central Building Research Institute	Uttarakhand	Roorkee	1947
CCMB- Centre for Cellular and Molecular Biology	Telangana	Hyderabad	1977
CDRI - Central Drug Research Institute	Uttar Pradesh	Lucknow	1951
CECRI- Central Electro Chemical Research Institute	Tamil Nadu	Karaikudi	1953
CEERI - Central Electronics Engineering Research Institute	Rajasthan	Pilani	1953
CFTRI - Central Food Technological Research Institute	Karnataka	Mysuru	1950
CGCRI - Central Glass and Ceramic Research Institute	West Bengal	Kolkata	1950
CIMAP - Central Institute of Medicinal and Aromatic Plants	Uttar Pradesh	Lucknow	1959
CIMFR - Central Institute of Mining and Fuel Research	Jharkhand	Dhanbad	2007
CLRI - Central Leather Research Institute	Tamil Nadu	Chennai	1947
CMERI - Central Mechanical Engineering Research Institute	West Bengal	Durgapur	1958
CRRI - Central Road Research Institute	Delhi	New Delhi	1952
CSIO - Central Scientific Instruments Organisation	Chandigarh	Chandigarh	1959
CSMCRI - Central Salt and Marine Chemicals Research Institute	Gujarat	Bhavnagar	1954
IGIB - Institute of Genomics and Integrative Biology	Delhi	New Delhi	1977
IHBT - Institute of Himalayan Bioresource Technology	Himachal Pradesh	Palampur	1983
IICB - Indian Institute of Chemical Biology	West Bengal	Kolkata	1935
IICT - Indian Institute of Chemical Technology	Telangana	Hyderabad	1944
IIIM, Jammu - Indian Institute of Integrative Medicine	Jammu and Kashmir	Jammu	1941
IIP - Indian Institute of Petroleum	Uttarakhand	Dehradun	1960
IMMT - Institute of Minerals and Materials Technology	Odisha	Bhubaneswar	1964
IMTECH - Institute of Microbial Technology	Chandigarh	Chandigarh	1984
IITR - Indian Institute of Toxicology Research	Uttar Pradesh	Lucknow	1965
NAL - National Aerospace Laboratories	Karnataka	Bengaluru	1959
NBRI - National Botanical Research Institute	Uttar Pradesh	Lucknow	1953
NCL - National Chemical Laboratory	Maharashtra	Pune	1950
NEERI - National Environmental Engineering Research Institute	Maharashtra	Nagpur	1958
NEIST - North East Institute of Science and Technology, Jorhat	Assam	Jorhat	1961
NGRI - National Geophysical Research Institute	Telangana	Hyderabad	1961
NIIST - National Institute for Interdisciplinary Science and Technology	Kerala	Thiruvananthapuram	1975
NIO - National Institute of Oceanography	Goa	Dona Paula	1966
NIScPR - National Institute of Science Communication and Policy Research	Delhi	New Delhi	2021
NML - National Metallurgical Laboratory	Jharkhand	Jamshedpur	1944
NPL - National Physical Laboratory	Delhi	New Delhi	1947
OSDD - Open Source Drug Discovery	Delhi	New Delhi	2008
SERC - Structural Engineering Research Centre	Tamil Nadu	Chennai	1965
URDIP - Unit for Research and Development of Information Products	Maharashtra	Pune	2010

== Journals ==
18 journals and 3 popular science magazines (Science Reporter and its Hindi, Urdu editions) are available under open access from NOPR website.

== See also ==
- Forest Research Institute (India), Dehradun
- Indian Institutes of Science Education and Research (IISER)
- National Centre for Biological Sciences, Bengaluru
- National Institute of Science Education and Research (NISER)
- Open access in India
- Shanti Swarup Bhatnagar Prize for Science and Technology
- Telecommunication Engineering Center, New Delhi
- Charles Walters Council for Innovation and Research, Uttar Pradesh
- Indian Council of Agricultural Research
- Indian Council of Medical Research
