= Mahindra Gujarat Tractors Limited =

Mahindra Group

- Formerly: Mahindra Gujarat Tractors Limited
- Headquarters: Varodara, Gujarat
- Owner: Mahindra & Mahindra
- Parent: Mahindra & Mahindra
- Website: https://trakstartractor.com/

Mahindra Gujarat Tractors Limited, is a Farm Tractor manufacturer now part of Mahindra & Mahindra from the Government of Gujarat in 1999. It the oldest running tractor unit in India. The Mahindra Group has a 60% stake, the remaining 40% being held by the Government of Gujarat. Its best selling models is Hindustan 60. The tractors are now sold under Sakthimaan and Trakstar brand names. It was renamed as Gromax Agri Equipment Ltd. in 2017.

== History ==
Originally founded in 1964 in cooperation with Motokov-Praha (Zetor) of Czechoslovakia. The company is based in the state of Gujarat.The company had several ownership changes since its inception.

=== Tractor & Bulldozer Pvt. Ltd ===
Since 1912, Bombay based Pashabhai Patel used to import tractors, through M/s Pashabhai Patel & Co. After independence, he was asked to procure 500 tractors by the Prime Minister Sri Jawaharlal Nehru. Licence was issued to the company, which entered into collaboration with Motokov Praha (Zetor) Czechoslovakia, and the name of the company was changed to Tractor & Bulldozer Pvt. Ltd. in 1964. Due to unavoidable problems, the company was handed over to Gujarat Agro in 1967.

=== Hindustan Tractors Ltd ===
In 1967 the company name was changed to Hindustan Tractor Ltd. Since demand for 60 hp tractors were much less than the small capacity the tractor was mostly favoured by heavy haulage users.

=== Gujarat Tractor Corporation Ltd. ===
The company changed hands again in 1978, when the Gujarat State Government took it in its own hands and renamed it as Gujarat Tractor Corporation Ltd. (GTCL).After the disinvestment in 1999, it was renamed as Mahindra Gujarat Tractor Ltd. (MGTL)

== Mahindra Gujarat Tractor Ltd ==
Mahindra Gujarat Tractor Limited (MGTL) has its head office at Vadodara (formerly Baroda), Gujarat. Sri S.O. Tyagi is the head of MGTL, and Sri Pavan Deolia is the General Manager of Marketing. Mahindra Gujarat Tractor Limited (MGTL) has been a subsidiary of Mahindra & Mahindra (M&M) since 1999.

The company operated as Gujarat Tractor Corporation Limited, promoted by the Government of Gujarat (GoG) in 1978, and manufactured and marketed tractors under "Hindustan" brand name. The company presently manufactures powerful and fuel efficient tractors in a range from 30–60 hp marketed under the "Shaktimaan" and "Farmplus" brands. MGTL is an ISO 9001:2008 and OHSAS18001:2007 certified company. The company has a very good marketing network across India having 13 area offices and around 225 dealers.

== Gromax Agri Equipment Limited ==
Recently in 2017 Mahindra group renamed the company as Gromax Agri Equipment Limited, as part of new brand strategy and the models continue to be sold as Trakstar tractors. The long time best seller Hindustan 60 was relaunched recently and is now sold as Mahindra Hindustan 60 and Sakthimaan 60 ELX.

== Models ==
Today, the tractors are sold under the "Shaktimaan" and "Farmplus" brands in the 30–60 hp range. Mahindra & Mahindra has now incorporated the "Shaktimaan" and "Farmplus" brands of tractors of Mahindra Gujarat Tractor Limited (MGTL) as its subsidiary, and is manufacturing its 30 hp and 35 hp models at its own plant at Nagpur, which are marketed by MGTL. For the other models, only the Engines are manufactured at MGTL plant, and the Transmissions are manufactured by M&M itself. Strict quality control is maintained by M&M. The Vadodara plant has also been renovated and modern assembly systems have been installed there.
