= Charles Walters Council for Innovation and Research =

Indian research and innovation organisation

- Abbreviation: CWCIR
- Formation: 19 July 2021
- Type: Section 8 company
- Headquarters: Gorakhpur, Uttar Pradesh, India
- Director: Abhishek Pandey
- Website: www.cwsir.org

Charles Walters Council for Innovation and Research is an Indian research and innovation organisation registered as a Section 8 under the Companies Act 2013. It is based in Uttar Pradesh, India. The organisation was established in the name of Charles Walters. CWCIR is also presents the Honour of Ashoka Award.

== See also ==
- Council of Scientific and Industrial Research
- Indian Council of Agricultural Research
- Honour of Ashoka Award
