= Immunotherapy =

Activation or suppression of the immune system to treat disease

- The diagram above represents the process of chimeric antigen receptor T-cell therapy (CAR), this is a method of immunotherapy, which is a growing practice in the treatment of cancer. The final result should be a production of equipped T-cells that can recognize and fight the infected cancer cells in the body.: 1. T-cells (represented by objects labeled as 't') are removed from the patient's blood.; 2. Then in a lab setting the gene that encodes for the specific antigen receptors are incorporated into the T-cells.; 3. Thus producing the CAR receptors (labeled as c) on the surface of the cells.; 4. The newly modified T-cells are then further harvested and grown in the lab.; 5. After a certain time period, the engineered T-cells are infused back into the patient.
- MeSH: D007167
- OPS-301 code: 8-03

Immunotherapy, also known as biological therapy or biotherapy, encompasses a diverse set of therapeutic strategies that harness or modify the immune system to prevent, control, or eliminate disease. In its narrowest definition, immunotherapy refers to treatments designed to stimulate or guide the immune system to recognize and fight cancer, often by enhancing or restoring immune responses to eradicate malignant cells while sparing healthy tissue.

A broader definition of immunotherapy applies beyond oncology, including strategies to stimulate or suppress immune activity against other diseases such as autoimmune disorders, infectious diseases, and allergies. These approaches may involve vaccines, immune modulators, or monoclonal antibodies designed to alter immune responses, either to boost protection against pathogens or to reduce damaging inflammation.

Immunotherapy includes both passive methods, like monoclonal antibodies that mark abnormal cells for immune destruction, and active methods, such as cancer vaccines, immune checkpoint inhibitors, adoptive cell transfer, and cytokine therapies. Advances in immunotherapy have transformed the treatment landscape for cancer and are increasingly applied to a wider range of conditions, improving outcomes for many patients, though responses can vary depending on disease type, genetic background, and environmental factors.

Cell-based immunotherapies are effective for some cancers. Immune effector cells such as lymphocytes, macrophages, dendritic cells, natural killer cells, and cytotoxic T lymphocytes work together to defend the body against cancer by targeting abnormal antigens expressed on the surface of tumor cells. Vaccine-induced immunity to COVID-19 relies mostly on an immunomodulatory T-cell response.

Therapies such as granulocyte colony-stimulating factor (G-CSF), interferons, imiquimod and cellular membrane fractions from bacteria are licensed for medical use. Others including IL-2, IL-7, IL-12, various chemokines, synthetic cytosine phosphate-guanosine (CpG) oligodeoxynucleotides and glucans are involved in clinical and preclinical studies.

== Immunomodulators ==
Immunomodulators are the active agents of immunotherapy. They are a diverse array of recombinant, synthetic, and natural preparations.

Class	Example agents
Interleukins	IL-2, IL-7, IL-12
Cytokines	Interferons, G-CSF
Chemokines	CCL3, CCL26, CXCL7
Immunomodulatory imide drugs (IMiDs)	thalidomide and its analogues (lenalidomide, pomalidomide, and apremilast), BCG vaccine, & COVID vaccines
Other	cytosine phosphate-guanosine, oligodeoxynucleotides, glucans

== Activation immunotherapies ==
=== Cancer ===
Cancer treatment used to be focused on killing or removing cancer cells and tumours, with chemotherapy or surgery or radiation. In 2018 the Nobel Prize in Physiology or Medicine was awarded to James P. Allison and Tasuku Honjo "for their discovery of cancer therapy by inhibition of negative immune regulation". Cancer immunotherapy attempts to stimulate the immune system to destroy tumours. A variety of strategies are in use or are undergoing research and testing. Randomized controlled studies in different cancers resulting in significant increase in survival and disease free period have been reported and its efficacy is enhanced by 20–30% when cell-based immunotherapy is combined with conventional treatment methods.

One of the oldest forms of cancer immunotherapy is the use of BCG vaccine, which was originally to vaccinate against tuberculosis and later was found to be useful in the treatment of bladder cancer. BCG immunotherapy induces both local and systemic immune responses. The mechanisms by which BCG immunotherapy mediates tumor immunity have been widely studied, but they are still not completely understood.

The use of monoclonal antibodies in cancer therapy was first introduced in 1997 with rituximab, an anti-CD20 antibody for treatment of B cell lymphoma. Since then several monoclonal antibodies have been approved for treatment of various haematological malignancies as well as for solid tumours.

The extraction of G-CSF lymphocytes from the blood and expanding in vitro against a tumour antigen before reinjecting the cells with appropriate stimulatory cytokines. The cells then destroy the tumour cells that express the antigen. Topical immunotherapy utilizes an immune enhancement cream (imiquimod) which produces interferon, causing the recipient's killer T cells to destroy warts, actinic keratoses, basal cell cancer, vaginal intraepithelial neoplasia, squamous cell cancer, cutaneous lymphoma, and superficial melanoma. Injection immunotherapy ("intralesional" or "intratumoural") uses mumps, candida, the HPV vaccine or trichophytin antigen injections to treat warts (HPV induced tumours).

Adoptive cell transfer has been tested on lung and other cancers, with greatest success achieved in melanoma.

==== Dendritic cell-based pump-priming or vaccination ====
Dendritic cells (DC) can be stimulated to activate a cytotoxic response towards an antigen. Dendritic cells, a type of antigen-presenting cell, are harvested from the person needing the immunotherapy. These cells are then either pulsed with an antigen or tumour lysate or transfected with a viral vector, causing them to display the antigen. Upon transfusion into the person, these activated cells present the antigen to the effector lymphocytes (CD4+ helper T cells, cytotoxic CD8+ T cells and B cells). This initiates a cytotoxic response against tumour cells expressing the antigen (against which the adaptive response has now been primed). The first FDA-approved cell-based immunotherapy, the cancer vaccine Sipuleucel-T is one example of this approach. The Immune Response Corporation (IRC) developed this immunotherapy and licensed the technology to Dendreon, which obtained FDA clearance.

The current approaches for DC-based vaccination are mainly based on antigen loading on in vitro-generated DCs from monocytes or CD34+ cells, activating them with different TLR ligands, cytokine combinations, and injecting them back to the patients. The in vivo targeting approaches comprise administering specific cytokines (e.g., Flt3L, GM-CSF) and targeting the DCs with antibodies to C-type lectin receptors or agonistic antibodies (e.g., anti-CD40) that are conjugated with antigen of interest. Multiple, next-generation anti-CD40 platforms are being actively developed. Future approach may target DC subsets based on their specifically expressed C-type lectin receptors or chemokine receptors. Another potential approach is the generation of genetically engineered DCs from induced pluripotent stem cells and use of neoantigen-loaded DCs for inducing better clinical outcome.

==== Adoptive cell therapy ====
Adoptive cell therapy encompasses three main approaches: (1) TIL therapy, (2) T cell receptor-engineered T cells (TCR-T cells), and (3) chimeric antigen receptor T cells (CAR-T cells), with newer adaptations including CAR-NK cells and CAR-macrophages under early investigation.

The first proof-of-concept for ACT was demonstrated by Steven Rosenberg and colleagues in 1988, when they showed that TILs expanded ex vivo and reinfused into patients, together with high-dose interleukin-2, could mediate tumor regression in patients with metastatic melanoma. In 2024, FDA has granted an accelerated approval for lifileucel, a TIL-based therapy for metastatic melanoma.

Adoptive cell transfer in vitro cultivates autologous, extracted T cells for later transfusion.

Alternatively, genetically engineered T cells are created by harvesting T cells and then infecting the T cells with a retrovirus that contains a copy of a T cell receptor (TCR) gene that is specialised to recognise tumour antigens. The virus integrates the receptor into the T cells' genome. The cells are expanded non-specifically and/or stimulated. The cells are then reinfused and produce an immune response against the tumour cells. The technique has been tested on refractory stage IV metastatic melanomas and advanced skin cancer. In 2024, the FDA granted accelerated approval to afamitresgene autoleucel (TECELTA, Adaptimmune LLC), the first TCR-T therapy for solid tumors.

CAR-T therapy uses peripheral blood T cells that are genetically engineered ex vivo to express synthetic receptors targeting specific tumor antigens. To date, the FDA has approved several CAR-T cell therapies for hematological malignancies, including B-cell acute lymphoblastic leukemia, B-cell lymphoma, and multiple myeloma. The first FDA-approved CAR-T therapy, Kymriah, used this approach. To obtain the clinical and commercial supply of this CAR-T, Novartis purchased the manufacturing plant, the distribution system and hired the production team that produced Sipuleucel-T developed by Dendreon and the Immune Response Corporation.

Whether T cells are genetically engineered or not, before re-infusion, lympho-depletion of the recipient is required to eliminate regulatory T cells as well as unmodified, endogenous lymphocytes that compete with the transferred cells for homeostatic cytokines. Lymphodepletion may be achieved by myeloablative chemotherapy, to which total body irradiation may be added for greater effect. Transferred cells multiplied in vivo and persisted in peripheral blood in many people, sometimes representing levels of 75% of all CD8^{+} T cells at 6–12 months after infusion. As of 2012, clinical trials for metastatic melanoma were ongoing at multiple sites. Clinical responses to adoptive transfer of T cells were observed in patients with metastatic melanoma resistant to multiple immunotherapies. Although CAR-T cell therapies have shown significant success in hematological malignancies, their application in solid tumors remains limited. Several recent reviews discussed emerging strategies for solid tumor CAR-T cell therapy, and highlighted novel targets that may help overcome current challenges in antigen specificity and tumor infiltration.

==== Checkpoint inhibitors ====
Anti-PD-1/PD-L1 and anti-CTLA-4 antibodies are the two types of checkpoint inhibitors currently available to patients. The approval of anti-cytotoxic T-lymphocyte-associated protein 4 (CTLA-4) and anti-programmed cell death protein 1 (PD-1) antibodies for human use has already resulted in significant improvements in disease outcomes for various cancers.

Although these molecules were originally discovered as molecules playing a role in T cell activation or apoptosis, subsequent preclinical research showed their important role in the maintenance of peripheral immune tolerance.

Immune checkpoint inhibitors are approved to treat some patients with a variety of cancer types, including melanoma, breast cancer, bladder cancer, cervical cancer, colon cancer, lung cancer head and neck cancer, or Hodgkin lymphoma.

These therapies have revolutionized cancer immunotherapy as they showed for the first time in many years of research in metastatic melanoma, which is considered one of the most immunogenic human cancers, an improvement in overall survival, with an increasing group of patients benefiting long-term from these treatments, although caution remains needed for specific subgroups.

The next generation of checkpoint inhibitors targets other receptors such as lymphocyte-activation gene 3 (LAG-3), T-cell immunoglobulin and mucin-domain containing-3 (TIM3), and T cell immunoreceptor with Ig and ITIM domains (TIGIT). Antibodies against these receptors have been evaluated in clinical studies, but have not yet been approved for widespread use.

=== Alzheimer’s disease ===
The pathology of Alzheimer’s disease (AD) is characterized by the accumulation in the brain of two abnormally folded proteins: Aβ protein in Aβ plaques and tau protein in neurofibrillary tangles. Genetic and biomarker evidence indicates that abnormal Aβ is the earliest defining feature of AD and that tauopathy occurs later.

As of 2026, two anti-Aβ antibodies – lecanemab (Leqembi) and donanemab (Kisunla) – have been approved by the U.S. FDA to treat mild cognitive impairment and mild-to-moderate dementia of AD (aducanumab was discontinued in 2024). In treated subjects, these antibodies reduce the amount of Aβ in the brain, and may be able to slow the progression of cognitive decline. Their adoption has been slowed by the cost of passive immunotherapy and the appearance in some people of potentially serious side-effects known as amyloid-related imaging abnormalities (ARIA).

== Immune enhancement therapy ==
Autologous immune enhancement therapy use a person's own peripheral blood-derived natural killer cells, cytotoxic T lymphocytes, epithelial cells and other relevant immune cells are expanded in vitro and then re-infused. The therapy has been tested against hepatitis C, chronic fatigue syndrome and HHV6 infection.

== Suppression immunotherapies ==
Immune suppression dampens an abnormal immune response in autoimmune diseases or reduces a normal immune response to prevent rejection of transplanted organs or cells.

=== Immunosuppressive drugs ===
Immunosuppressive drugs can be used to control the immune system with organ transplantation and with autoimmune disease. Immune responses depend on lymphocyte proliferation. Lymphocyte proliferation is the multiplication of lymphocyte cells used to fight and remember foreign invaders. Cytostatic drugs are a type of immunosuppressive drug that aids in slowing down the growth of rapidly dividing cells. Another example of an immunosuppressive drug is Glucocorticoids which are more specific inhibitors of lymphocyte activation. Glucocorticoids work by emulating actions of natural actions of the body's adrenal glands to help suppress the immune system, which is helpful with autoimmune diseases. Alternatively, inhibitors of immunophilins more specifically target T lymphocyte activation, the process by which T-lymphocytes stimulate and begin to respond to a specific antigen, There is also Immunosuppressive antibodies which target steps in the immune response to prevent the body from attacking its tissues, which is a problem with autoimmune diseases, There are various other drugs that modulate immune responses and can be used to induce immune regulation. It was observed in a preclinical trial that regulation of the immune system by small immunosuppressive molecules such as vitamin D, dexamethasone, and curcumin could be helpful in preventing or treating chronic inflation. Given that the molecules are administered under a low-dose regimen and subcutaneously. A study provides a promising preclinical demonstration of the effectiveness and ease of preparation of Valrubicin-loaded immunoliposomes (Val-ILs) as a novel nanoparticle technology to target immunosuppressive cells. Val-ILs have the potential to be used as a precise and effective therapy based on targeted vesicle-mediated cell death of immunosuppressive cells.

=== Immune tolerance ===
The body naturally does not launch an immune system attack on its own tissues. Models generally identify CD4+ T-cells at the centre of the autoimmune response. Loss of T-cell tolerance then unleashes B-cells and other immune effector cells on to the target tissue. The ideal tolerogenic therapy would target the specific T-cell clones co-ordinating the autoimmune attack.

Immune tolerance therapies seek to reset the immune system so that the body stops mistakenly attacking its own organs or cells in autoimmune disease or accepts foreign tissue in organ transplantation. A recent therapeutic approach is the infusion of regulatory immune cells into transplant recipients. The transfer of regulatory immune cells has the potential to inhibit the activity of effector.

Creating immune tolerance reduces or eliminates the need for lifelong immunosuppression and attendant side effects. It has been tested on transplantations, rheumatoid arthritis, type 1 diabetes and other autoimmune disorders.

Approaches to therapeutic tolerance induction
	Modality	Details	
Non-antigen specific	Monoclonal Antibodies	Depleting: Anti-CD52; Anti-CD4; Anti-LFA-2	Non-depleting: Anti-CD4; Anti-CD3; Anti-LFA-1; CTLA4-Ig; Anti-CD25
	Haematopoietic stem cell transplantation	Non-myeloablative	Myeloablative
	Mesenchymal stem cell transplantation		
	Regulatory T cell therapy	Non-antigen specific	Antigen-specific
	Low dose IL-2 to expand regulatory T cells		
	Microbiome manipulation		
Antigen specific	Peptide therapy	Subcutaneous, intradermal, transmucosal (oral, inhaled) Tolerogenic dendritic cells, liposomes and nanoparticles	
	Altered peptide ligands		

=== Allergen immunotherapy ===
Immunotherapy can also be used to treat allergies. While allergy treatments (such as antihistamines or corticosteroids) treat allergic symptoms, immunotherapy can reduce sensitivity to allergens, lessening its severity. Allergen immunotherapy can also be referred to as allergen desensitization or hypo-sensitization. Immunotherapy may produce long-term benefits. Immunotherapy is partly effective in some people and ineffective in others, but it offers people with allergies a chance to reduce or stop their symptoms.

Subcutaneous allergen immunotherapy was first introduced in 1911 through the hypothesis that people with hay fever were sensitive to pollen from grass. A process was developed to create an extract by drawing out timothy pollen in distilled water and then boiling it. This was injected into patients in increasing doses to help alleviate symptoms.

Allergen Immunotherapy is indicated for people who are extremely allergic or who cannot avoid specific allergens and when there is evidence of an IgE-mediated reaction that correlates with allergen symptoms. These IgE-mediated reactions can be identified via a blood IgE test or skin testing. If a specific IgE antibody is negative, there is no evidence that allergen immunotherapy will be effective for that patient.

However, there are risks associated with allergen immunotherapy as it is the administration of an agent the patient is known to be highly allergic to. Patients are at increased risk of fatal anaphylaxis, local reaction at the site of injection, or life-threatening systemic allergic reactions.

A promising approach to treat food allergies is the use of oral immunotherapy (OIT). OIT consists in a gradual exposure to increasing amounts of allergen can lead to the majority of subjects tolerating doses of food sufficient to prevent reaction on accidental exposure. Dosages increase over time, as the person becomes desensitized. This technique has been tested on infants to prevent peanut allergies.

== Helminthic therapies ==
Whipworm ova (Trichuris suis) and hookworm (Necator americanus) have been tested for immunological diseases and allergies, and have proved beneficial on multiple fronts, yet it is not entirely understood. Scientists have found that the immune response triggered by the burrowing of hookworm larvae to pass through the lungs and blood so the production of mast cells and specific antibodies are now present. They also reduce inflammation or responses ties to autoimmune diseases, but despite this, the hookworm's effects are considered to be negative typically. Helminthic therapy has been investigated as a treatment for relapsing remitting multiple sclerosis, Crohn's disease, allergies and asthma. While there is much to be learned about this, many researchers think that the change in the immune response is thanks to the parasites shifting to a more anti-inflammatory or regulatory system, which would in turn decrease inflammation and self inflicted immune damage as seen in Crohn's and multiple sclerosis. Specifically, MS patients saw lower relapse rates and calmer symptoms in some cases when experimenting with helminthic therapy. Hypothesized mechanisms include re-polarisation of the T_{h}1 / T_{h}2 response and modulation of dendritic cell function. The helminths downregulate the pro-inflammatory T_{h}1 cytokines, interleukin-12 (IL-12), interferon-gamma (IFN-γ) and tumor necrosis factor-alpha (TNF-α), while promoting the production of regulatory T_{h}2 cytokines such as IL-10, IL-4, IL-5 and IL-13.

Co-evolution with helminths has shaped some of the genes associated with interleukin expression and immunological disorders, such Crohn's, ulcerative colitis and celiac disease. Helminths' relationship to humans as hosts should be classified as mutualistic or symbiotic. In some ways, the relationship is symbiotic because the worms themselves need the host (humans) for survival, because this body supplies them with nutrients and a home. From another perspective, it could be reasoned that it is mutualistic, being that the above information about benefits in autoimmune disorders continues to remain true and supported. Also, some say that the worms can regulate gut bacteria. Another possibility is one of this being a parasitic relationship, arguing that the possible risks of anemia and other disorders outweighs the benefits, yet this is significantly less supported, with the research alluding to the mutualistic and symbiotic approach being much more likely.

== See also ==
- Biological response modifier
- Sepsivac
- Checkpoint inhibitor
- Interleukin-2 immunotherapy
- Immunostimulant
- Microtransplantation
- Photoimmunotherapy in vitro or in vivo
