= Sepsivac =

Clinical data
- Other names: Mycobacterium w (heat killed)

Identifiers
- CAS Number: 2781058-36-2

Sepsivac is a drug developed by Cadila Pharmaceuticals to treat gram-negative sepsis. The active ingredient is heat-killed Mycobacterium w, a non-pathogenic strain of Mycobacterium. As an immunomodulatory, it modulates the immune system of the body and hence significantly reduces mortality rate in patients with gram negative sepsis. Sepsivac is a drug developed by CSIR and Cadila Pharmaceuticals under New Millennium Indian Technology Leadership Initiative (NMITLI) programme. In many cases, Sepsivac has proven to provide effective care and relief to COVID patients.

Sepsivac is approved by the Drug Controller General of India (DCGI) for treatment of sepsis or septic shock.

== Mechanism ==
In patients with sepsis, in response to an infection, many pro-inflammatory and anti-inflammatory cytokines are generated in the body. However, some of the cytokines also cause inflammation in the organs of the body, which might be harmful. Immunomodulator drugs such as Sepsivac regulate this host immune response. Sepsivac is found to be safe in patients with no systematic side-effects. It can be used in combination with other treatments to manage a patient in critical care setting.

== Sepsivac and COVID ==
Scientists at CSIR found similarities between the clinical characteristics of patients with gram-negative sepsis and COVID-19. In association with Cadila Pharmaceuticals, the researchers are now working on initiating a randomised, blinded, controlled clinical trial to evaluate Sepsivac's efficacy to reduce mortality in critically ill COVID-19 patients. The repurposed drug will boost the immunity of the body and limit the spread of COVID-19 and increase the recovery rate. The clinical trials will be conducted at national hospitals including PGIMER Chandigarh, AIIMS New Delhi, and AIIMS, Bhopal.
