= Unit for Research and Development of Information Products =

Research institute in Pune, India

- Type: Public / Research Institute
- Location: Pune, Maharashtra, India
- Campus: Urban
- Affiliations: Council of Scientific and Industrial Research (CSIR)
- Website: http://www.urdip.res.in

Unit for Research and Development of Information Products (URDIP) is a research institute located in Pune under the Council of Scientific & Industrial Research (CSIR), Government of India.
