= Honour of Ashoka Award =

- Awarded for: Excellence in public service and governance
- Country: India
- Presented by: Charles Walters Council for Innovation and Research
- First award: 2019
- Website: www.cwsir.org

Honour of Ashoka Award is a civilian honor to government officials for notable service in public administration and governance. The award is inspired by the Ashoka the Great.

== See also ==
- Ashoka the Great
