= Captain Tractors =

Tractor manufacturer in Gujarat, India

Captain Tractors Private Limited
- Formerly: Asha Exim Pvt Ltd
- Type: Private
- Industry: Manufacturing company
- Founded: 27 May 1994; 32 years ago in Rajkot, Gujarat
- Founder: G.T. Patel; M.T. Patel
- Headquarters: Rajkot, Gujarat, India
- Area served: Worldwide

Captain Tractors Private Limited (CTPL) is an Indian manufacturer of mini tractors and agricultural and farming equipment, headquartered in Rajkot, Gujarat. Founded in 1994, CTPL has received several awards, including four national awards and three state awards.

== History ==
The company was founded as Asha Exim Pvt Ltd in 1994 by brothers G.T. Patel and M.T. Patel from the state of Gujarat and changed its name to Captain Tractors. The first mini tractor was launched by the company in India in 1998 and named after the brand as Captain. The company started manufacturing agricultural implements and machinery for different farming systems after it received an approval from the Government of India. Its Captain DI 2600 model received a subsidy approval from the Government of India in 2004. In 2008, CTPL received two national awards from the Government of India.

In 2012, the company entered into a strategic partnership with TAFE Group for small tractor series. CTPL has about 60 percent market share in the mini tractor segment. In 2013 the company received an award for the Best R&D and Entrepreneurship from the Ministry of Micro, Small, and Medium Enterprises, India. In 2017, CTPL was a participant at the 77th edition of SIMA, the international agri-business show that was held from 26 February to 2 March 2017 at the Paris Nird Villepinte in France. The company has PA approval from countries including Germany, Spain, France, Portugal, Greece, Saudi Arabia, Belgium, Canada, Holland, Ivory Coast, Tunisia, Egypt, and Austria. It also received the Homologation certificate for European countries.

In 2021, CTPL initiated a Memorandum of Understanding agreement with the Government of Gujarat during the Vibrant Gujarat 2021 event for a total investment of Rs 100 crore committing to generate employment for 1790 people in Rajkot.

== International book of records ==
On April 6, 2023, CTPL converted 70 identical mini tractors into chariots during an event in Jetpur, Gujarat. These chariots were used to transport more than 140 idols of deities on a spiritual pilgrimage alongside walking participants, covering approximately 27 kilometers over 12 hours. The International Book of Records documented the event and recognized it as a world record for converting the highest number of mini tractors of the same model and color into chariots for a religious event.

== Mini Tractor Day ==
CTPL pioneered the development of indigenous mini tractors in India. After various experiments in 1994, the company invented the mini tractor and launched its first model on May 27, 1998. It was designed to mechanize agriculture and support small and marginal farmers in increasing agricultural productivity and income. This day is commemorated annually as 'The Mini Tractor Day' across 17 states. The product has received 10 national awards from the Government of India. In March 2024, the company launched its 250 Lion Series. These tractors featured Dual Cylinder Simpson Engines.

== Awards ==
- 2008 - Awarded two National Award for R&D efforts by the Government of India
- 2012 - Best MSME award by the Government of Gujarat
- 2015 - Awarded two National Award for Product Innovation & Outstanding Entrepreneurship in Micro & Small Enterprises
- 2021 - Farm Power Awards
- 2021 - ITOTY Award for Best Tractor between 21-30 HP
- 2022 - ITOTY Award for Best Tractor under 20 HP
- Patidar Udyog Ratna Award for Best Business Leadership
- 2024 - ITOTY Award for Best Tractor under 20 HP and Tractor Exporter of The Year
- 2025 - Captain Tractor's directors—Rajesh Movaliya, Kailesh Movaliya, Nayan Movaliya, Satish Movaliya, and Shailesh Movaliya—were featured in the Forbes Select 200 list.
