= Zetor =

Czech agricultural machinery manufacturer

- Company type: Privately held
- Industry: Agricultural machinery
- Founded: 1946
- Headquarters: Brno, Czech Republic
- Products: Tractors; Diesel engines
- Revenue: CZK 3.691 billion CZK (2015)
- Operating income: −195,902,000 Czech koruna (2018)
- Net income: −110,967,000 Czech koruna (2018)
- Total assets: 2,702,837,000 Czech koruna (2018)
- Number of employees: 681
- Parent: HTC Holding
- Website: www.zetor.com

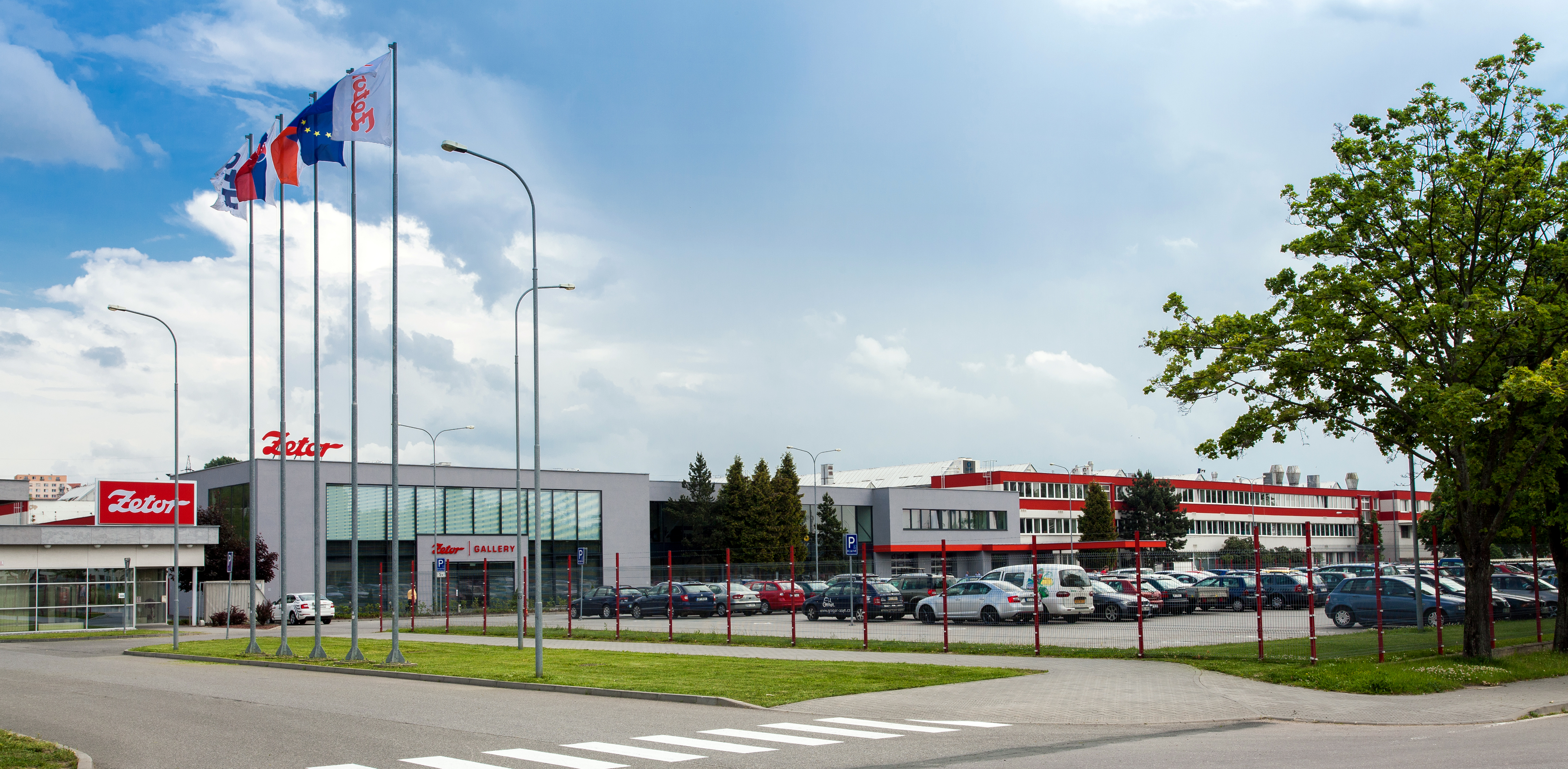
Zetor Headquarters in Brno

Zetor (since January 1, 2007, officially Zetor Tractors a.s.) is a Czech agricultural machinery manufacturer. It was founded in 1946. The company is based in Brno, Czech Republic. Since June 29, 2002, the only shareholder has been a Slovak company, HTC Holdings. The company manufactures tractors and tractor components (engines or transmissions).

Zetor was the first manufacturer to develop and produce tractor safety cabins. In its 70-year history, Zetor has sold over 1.3 million tractors. Currently, the Zetor portfolio includes six model ranges with power outputs ranging from 40 to 171 hp (30 to 130 kW).

Abroad, Zetor is represented through seven affiliations in North America, the United Kingdom, France, Germany, Poland, Slovakia and India. In 2015, 86% of the total production of the company was headed to foreign countries. In addition to traditional markets such as Poland, the Czech Republic, Slovakia, and Germany, its products are also exported to the UK, France, Ireland, and Lithuania.

== Name ==
The name Zetor, which was later to become the name of the brand and which was used by the state Company to mark the tractors, was created by Rostislav Sapák, a member of the Czech Economic Department, in the spring of 1946. (Note: The 'birth certificate' of the first Zetor tractor (Z25) is reportedly dated 15 March 1946, and the Zetor trademark was reportedly registered by the Czechoslovak Chamber of Commerce on 15 August 1946.) The name is formed of the syllable Zet (the spelling of the letter Z in the alphabet, the first letter of the name of the Arms Factory "Zbrojovka") and the suffix –or from the word tractor. It also relates to the phrase "farming tractor" in Czech: "ZEmědělský trakTOR" (other cryptonyms for the name are also possible).

== History ==
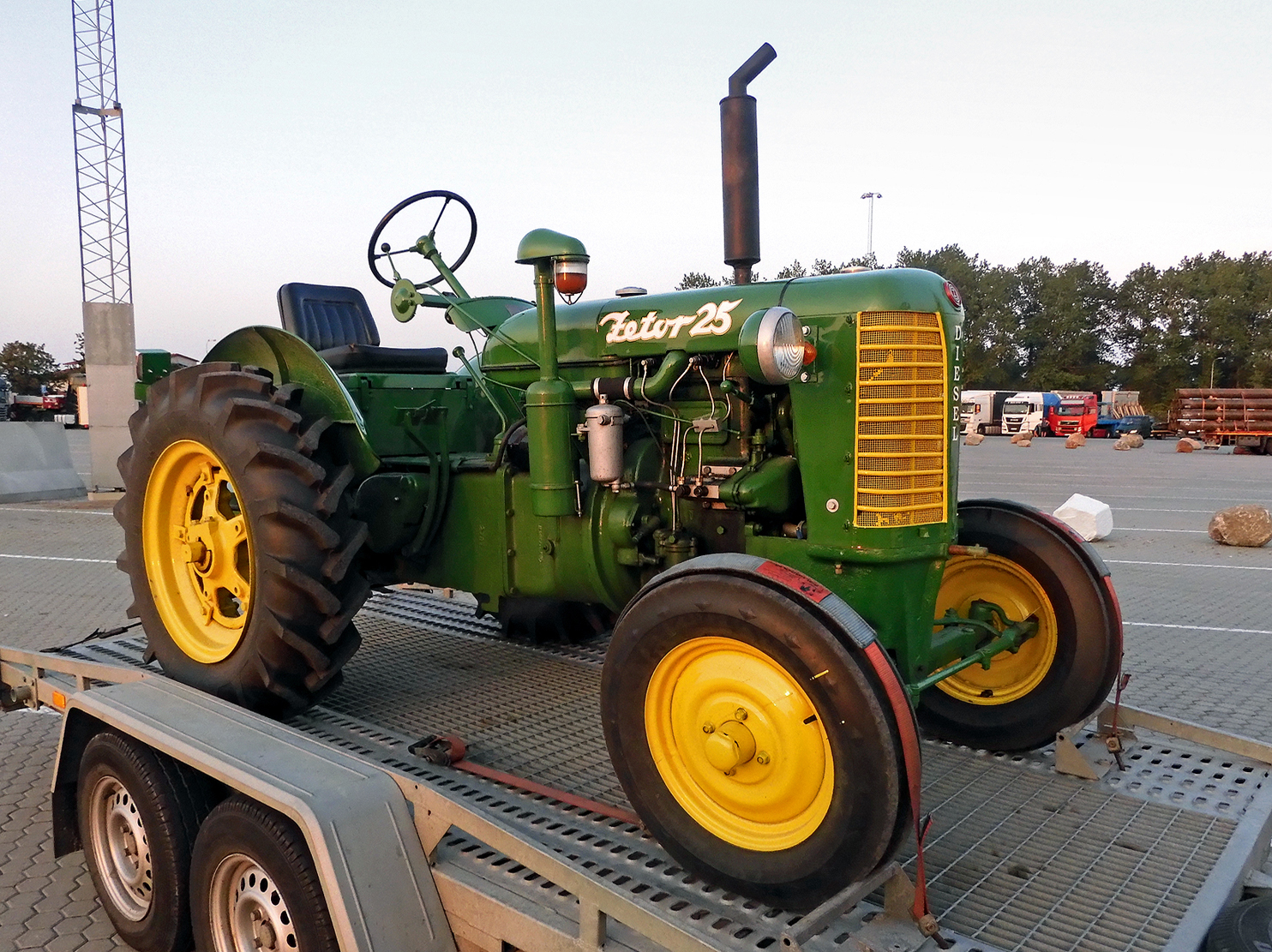
Zetor 25 (1946-1949)

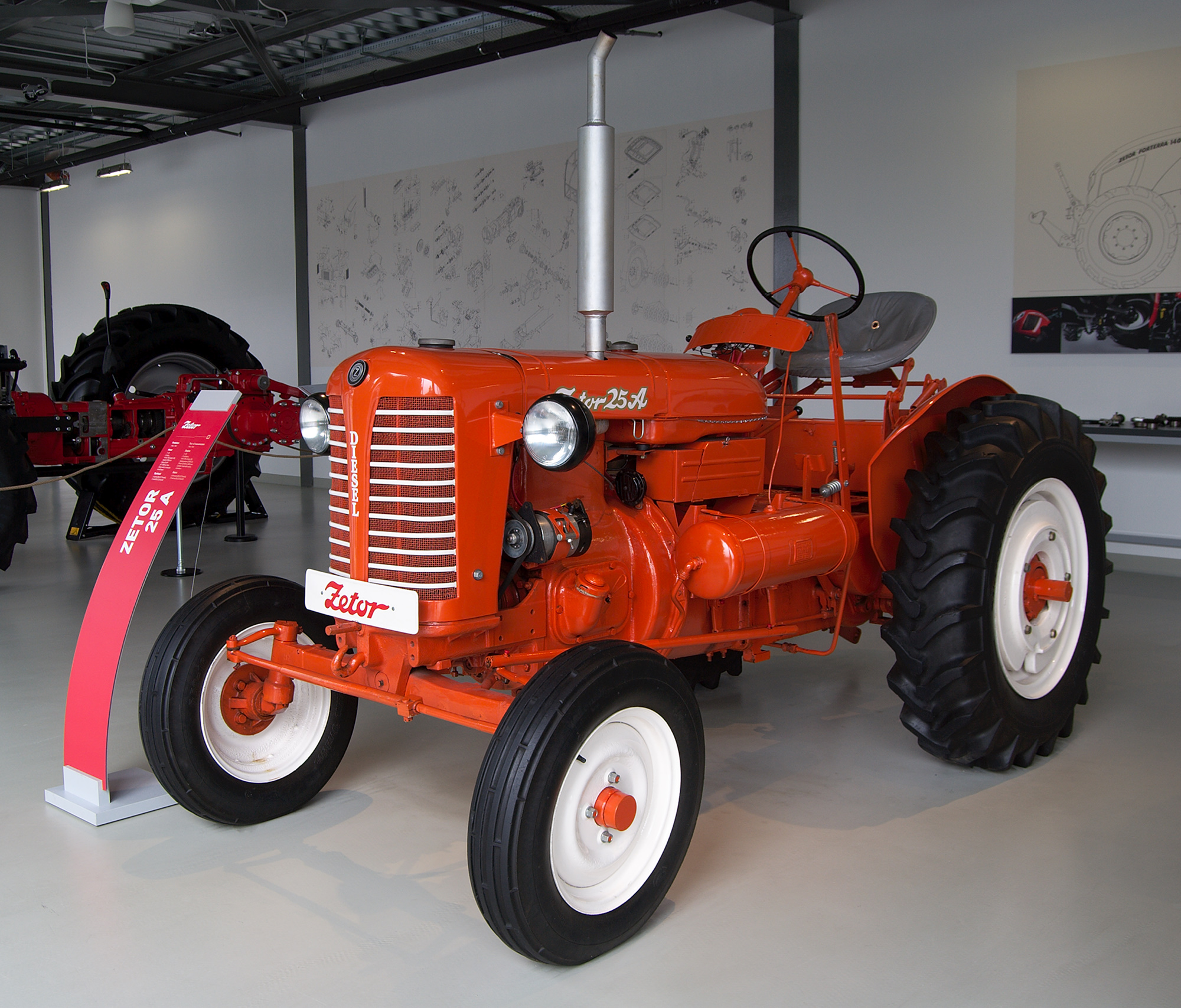
Zetor 25 A (1954-1961)

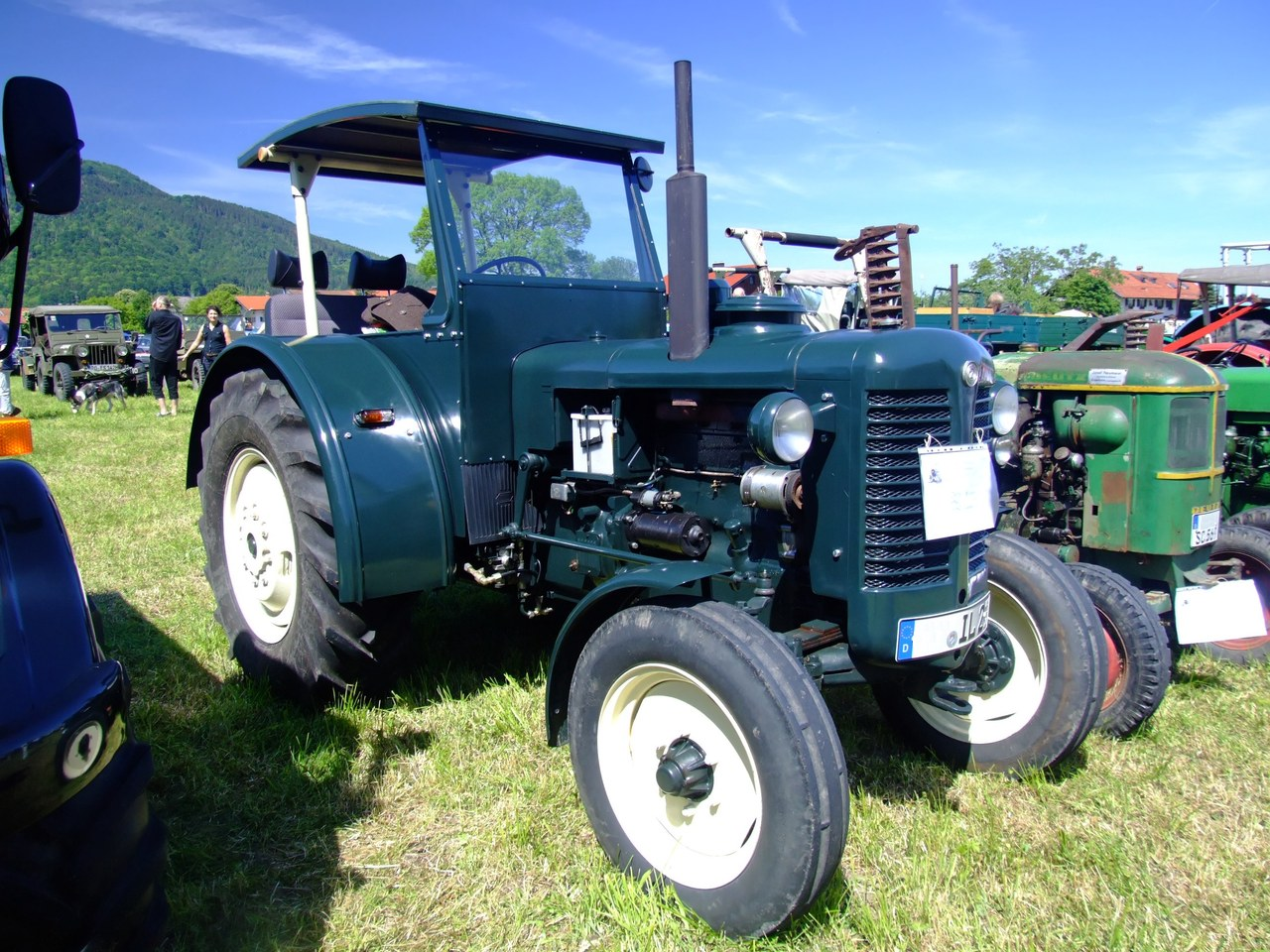
Zetor 50 Super, 1963

The history of Zetor starts in 1946 when the first tractor was produced by Zbrojovka Brno, branded Zetor 25. The Zetor trademark was registered in the same year, and mass production of Zetor tractors started on 7 August 1946. By 1947, about 3400 had been produced. In 1948, the Zetor 15 was approved for production, and it was manufactured until 1949. The Zetor 25A and 25K were manufactured until 1961, and 158,570 were produced, of which 97,000 were exported. The Zetor 35, with a 42 hp (31 kW) four-cylinder engine, was manufactured from 1955 to 1960 and then, as the upgraded Zetor 50 version, until 1968.

In 1952, Zetor moved to a new location within Brno, Líšeň, where all tractors have since been produced.

In the late 1950s, ZETOR was the first to introduce the concept of using unified parts to produce tractors worldwide. The Unified Series I (UŘ I.) was launched, with the models 2011, 3011, and 4011, with two, three, and four-cylinder engines.In 1968, the Unified Series II (UŘ II) was launched. Its development involved technical collaboration with the Polish tractor manufacturer Ursus, particularly in exchanging engineering knowledge and design principles. The series introduced many innovative features for its time, including the world's first safety cabin with a rollover protection system mounted on vibration isolators. The new cabin also reduced noise levels inside to below 85 dB. Thanks to these innovations, the Zetor brand gained international recognition.

In the 1970s, the first six-cylinder Zetor Crystal 12011 tractor was designed. In 1976, Zetor became the name of both the brand and the company. The company continued to evolve and, in 1991, the Unified Series III was launched. It was upgraded at the turn of the millennium and was branded the Zetor Forterra.

The Unified Series III (UŘ III) was launched in 1992, with models 7520, 7540, 8520, 8540, 9520, 9540, and 10540, having power outputs of between 82 and 103 hp (61 and 77 kW), badged as Model 92. In 1994, the 7320 Turbo and 7340 Turbo models extended the range. In 1997, the production of models 3321 super-7341 super turbo was launched, badged Model 97.

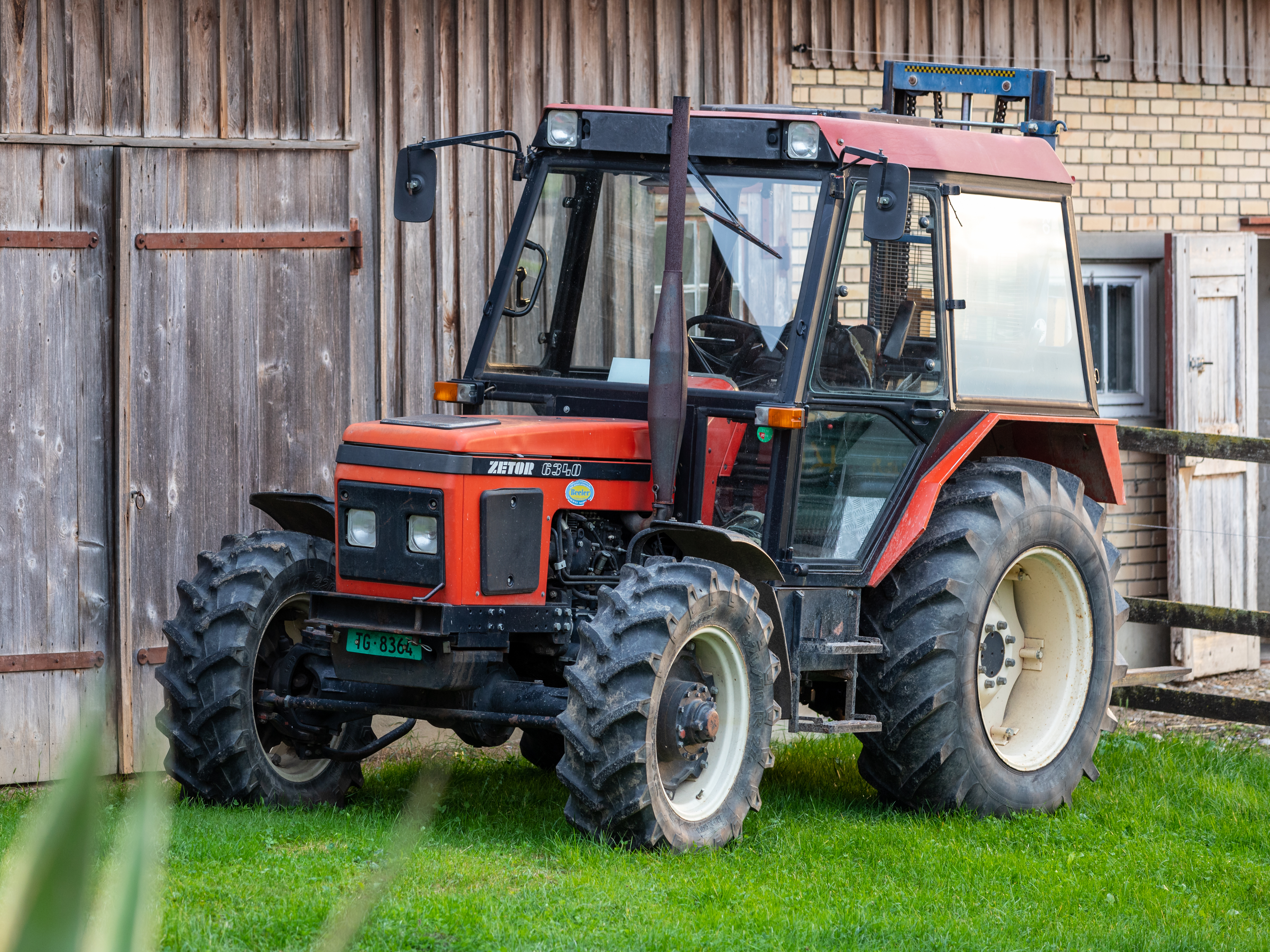
Zetor 6340 (1993-2007)

The turn of the millennium was a period of significant change for the Zetor brand. It could have disappeared because the state-owned enterprise faced bankruptcy. In June 2002, HTC Holdings of Slovakia became the new owner of Zetor. The new owners invested money to stabilise and restructure the enterprise.

== Current models ==
Zetor produces six tractor model ranges: Zetor Utilix, Zetor Hortus, Zetor Major, Zetor Proxima, Zetor Forterra, and Zetor Crystal. There are a total of 15 Zetor models in production as of early 2025.

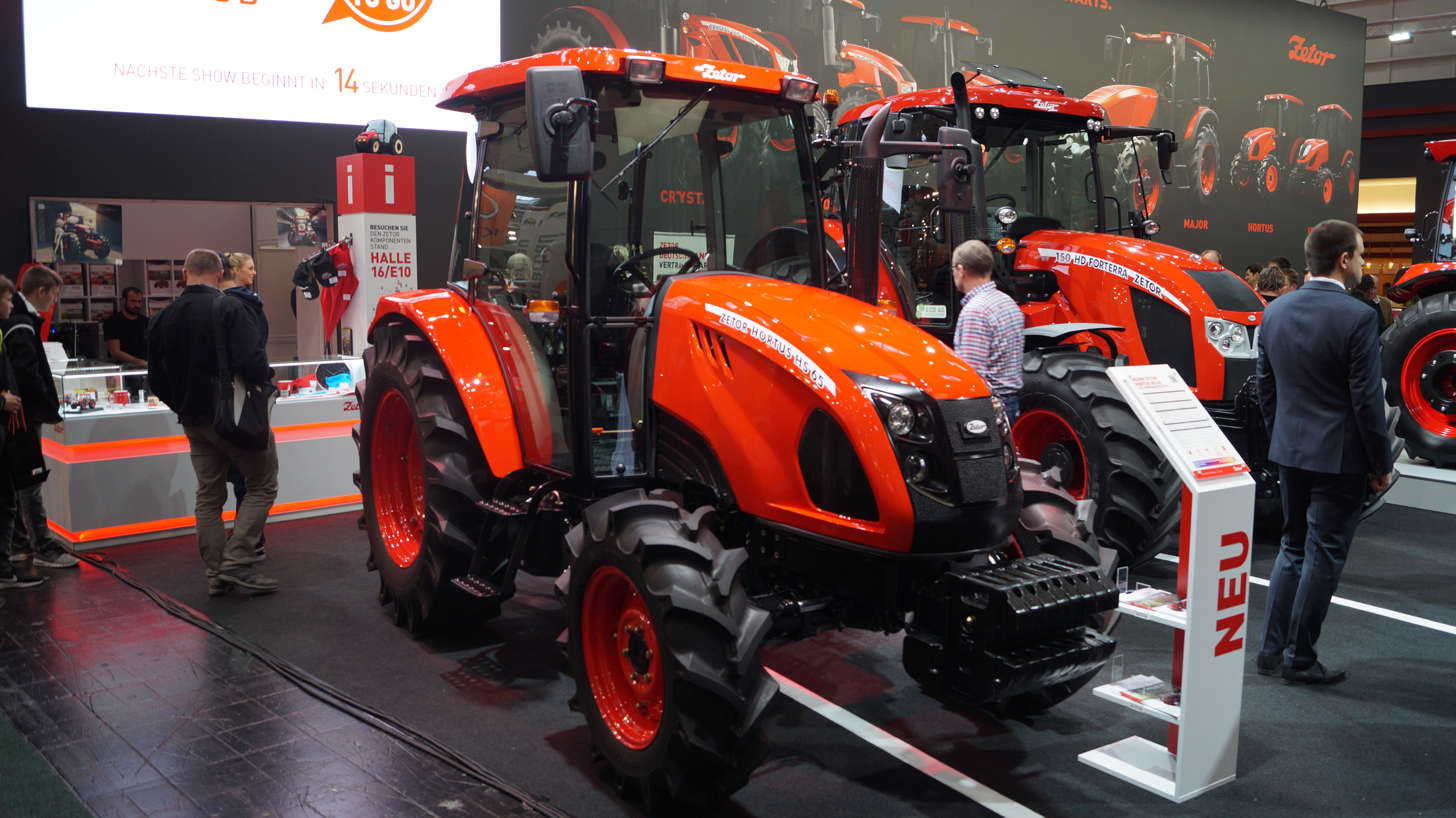
Zetor Hortus

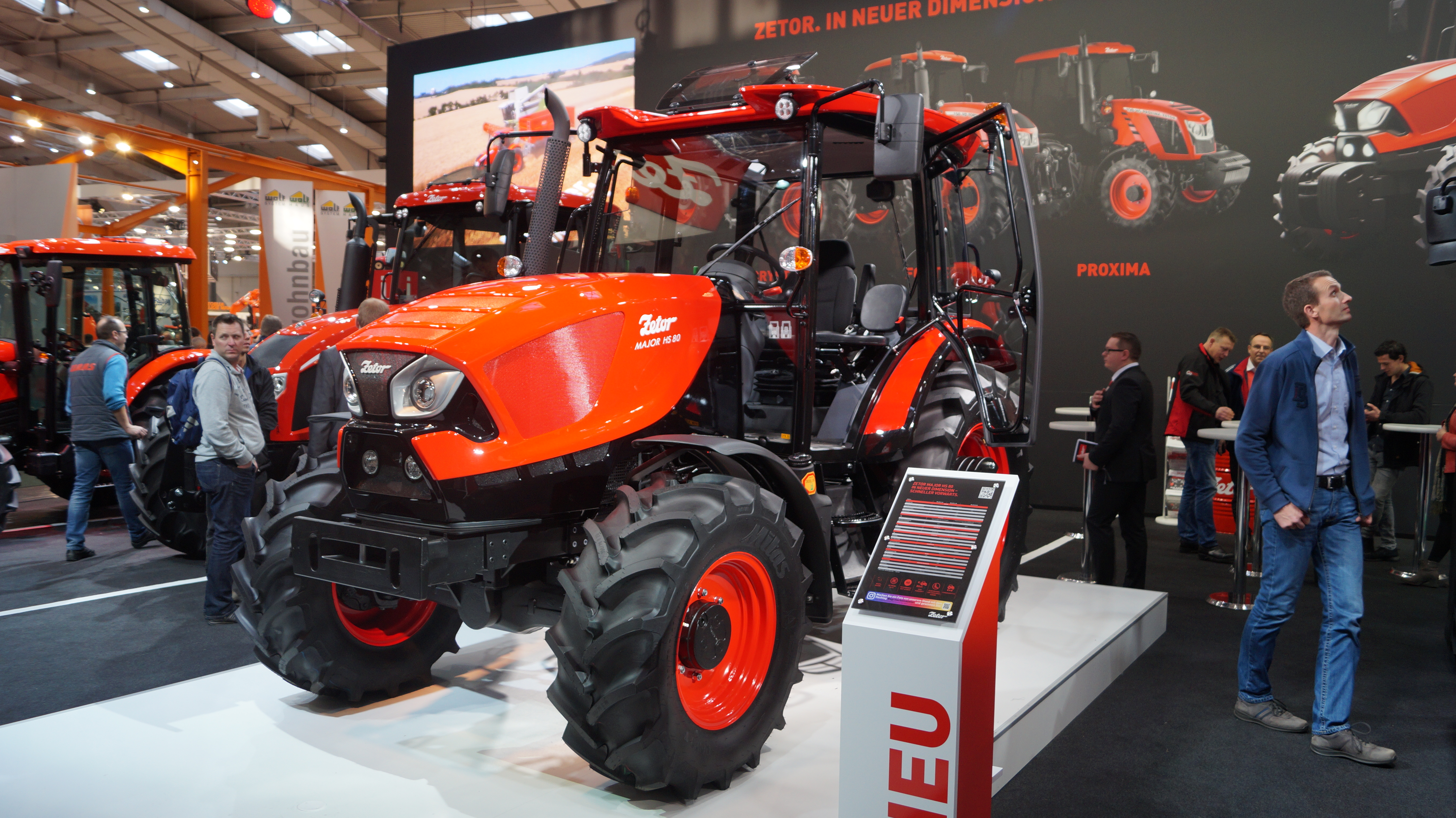
Zetor Major

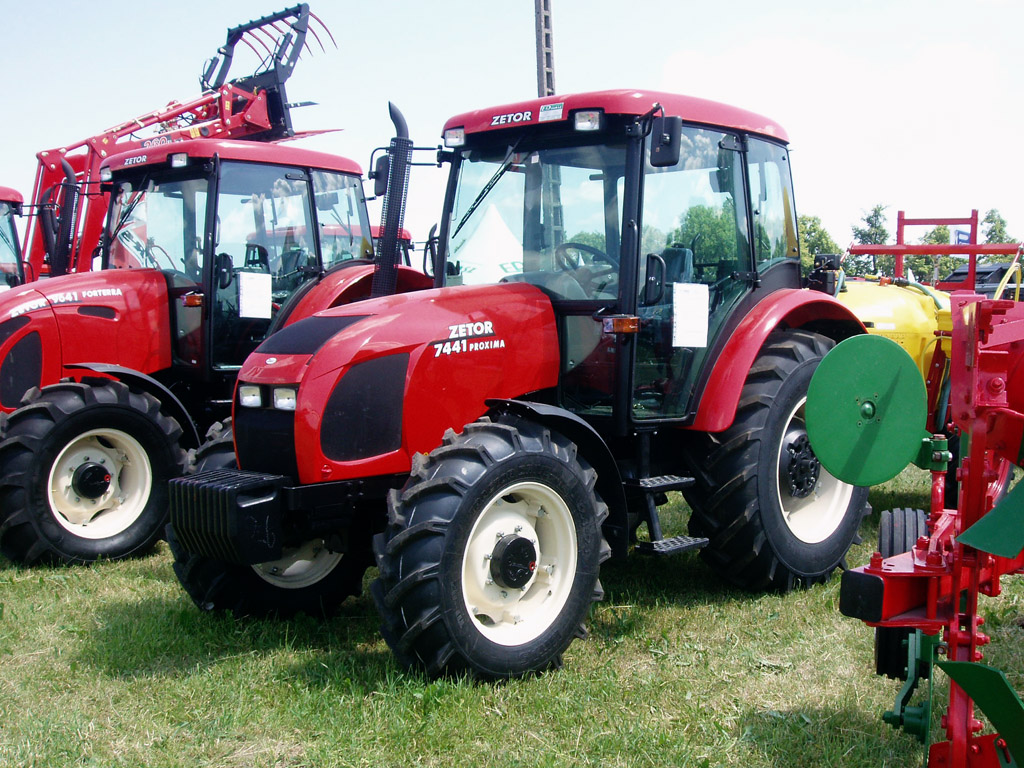
Zetor Proxima

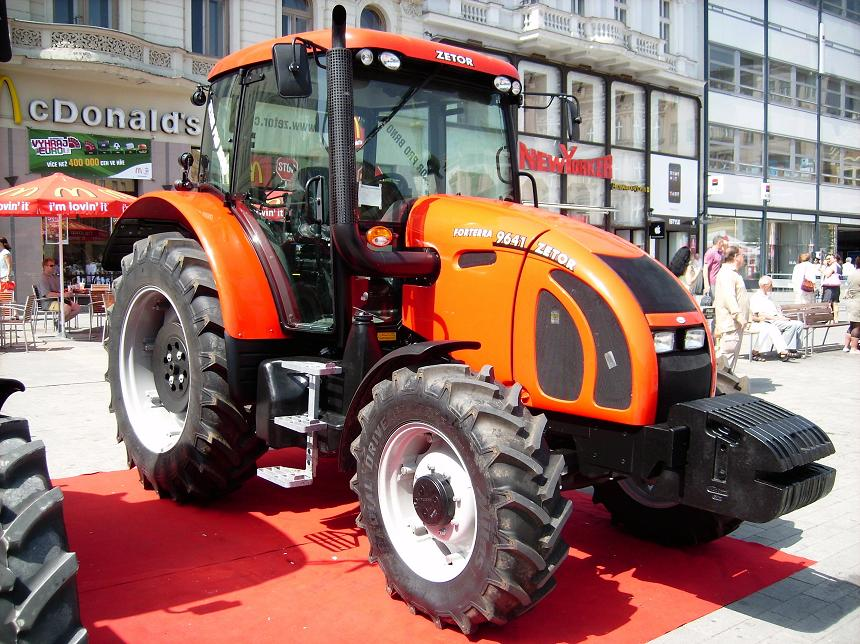
Zetor Forterra

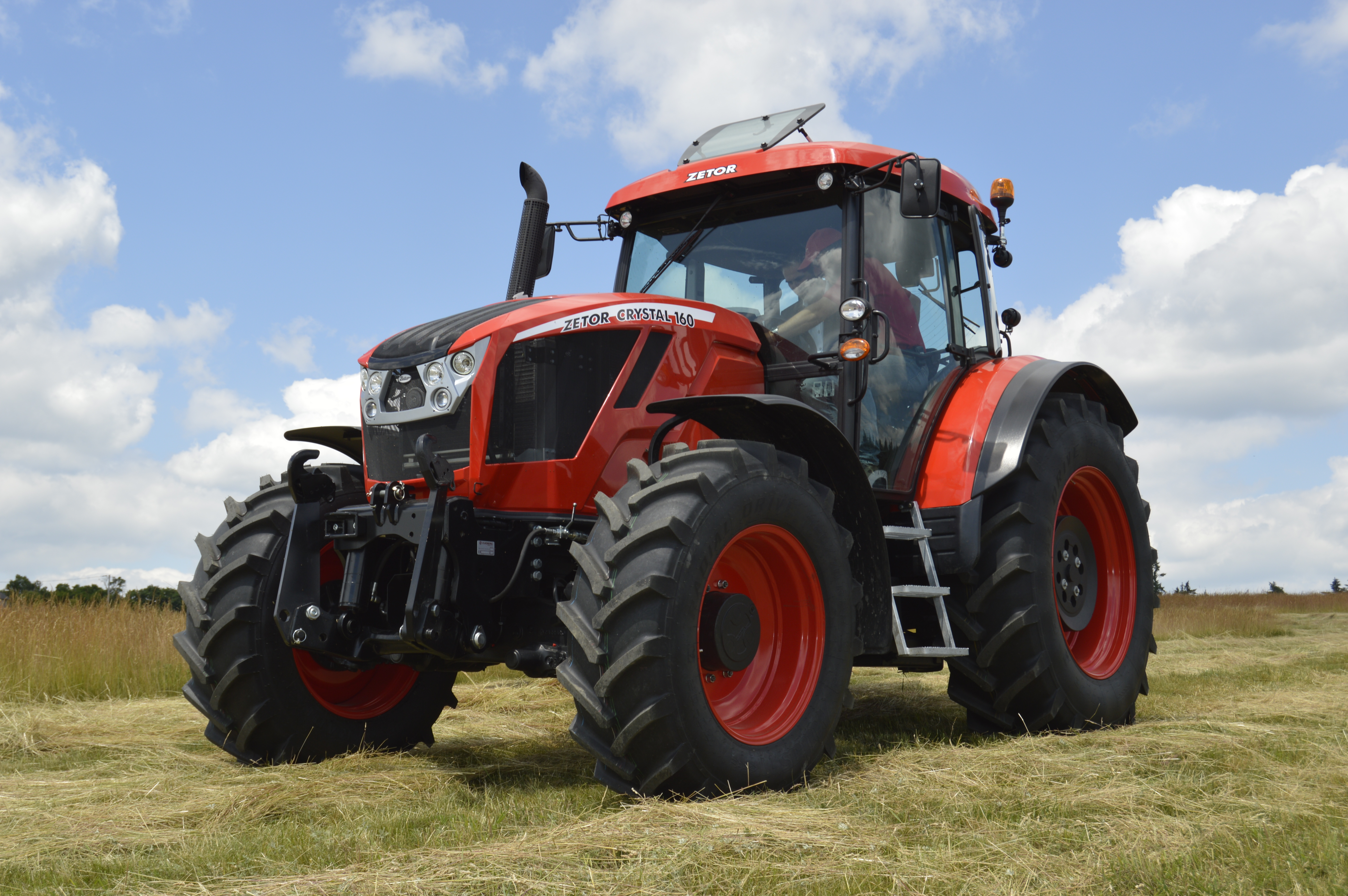
Zetor Crystal

=== Utilix and Hortus ===
The new Utilix and Hortus lineups were introduced in the first quarter of 2018. New tractors are small and light, equipped with 4-cylinder engines with power outputs of between 43 and 67 hp (32 and 50 kW).

=== Zetor Major ===
The Zetor Major range was launched in early 2002. It was a simple tractor with a power output of 80 hp (60 kW), appreciated for its reliability and low operating costs. In 2015, the Major range was extended by a new type Major 60 with a power output of 61 hp (45 kW). In late 2016, the company launched a new Major HS, which offered higher comfort while retaining low operation costs. Tractors of the Major range, included in the medium-power class, are appreciated for easy operation and service.

=== Zetor Proxima ===
The Proxima range entered the market in 2004. It is a universal farming tractor employing Zetor four-cylinder engines. They could be used in conjunction with farming machines, industrial adaptors, and in farming transport. They were mostly used in farming, forestry, and community service. Zetor manufactured three types: Proxima CL, Proxima GP, and Proxima HS, with power outputs ranging from 80 to 120 hp (60–89 kW), with a range of transmissions. They also offered creeper gears in the CL model, up to three-stage PowerShift or PowerShuttle.

=== Zetor Forterra ===
The Forterra range introduced robust tractors equipped with four-cylinder Zetor engines, which were suitable for heavy-duty work in farming and forestry. The first models entered the market in 2008. In 2012, the range was extended by the Forterra HSX, with 30/30 transmission and an electro-hydraulic reverser. In 2014, the range was extended by the Forterra HD, with a power output of 147 horsepower (110 kW) and electronic hydraulic regulation.

=== Zetor Crystal ===
For a long time, Zetor did not produce a powerful six-cylinder tractor. One was launched in 2015 when the unveiling of the Zetor Crystal. The name "Crystal" refers to the legendary tractors produced by Zetor from 1969 to the 1980s. In that period, over 45,000 Crystal tractors were sold. The new Crystal was equipped with a six-cylinder engine, having a power output of from 144 to 163 hp (107–122 kW). The engines had 24 valves and common-rail fuel injection. The transmission offered 30 forward and 30 reverse gears. The operation of the tractor was made easier by three-stage PowerShift, PowerShuttle, and PowerClutch, with the clutch button incorporated into the gear-shifting lever.

=== Branding of Zetor tractors ===
The Unified Series used new coding. The first two or three numbers of the marking of the tractor related to the approximate power of the engine in horsepower, e.g., 72, 80, 121, 162, etc. The next two numbers denote powered axles, e.g., 7211 (Zetor with approximate power of 72 hp (54 kW) without front-wheel drive).

- 45 (Zetor with 4WD)
- 16 (Semi-caterpillar version)

=== Zetor by Pininfarina ===
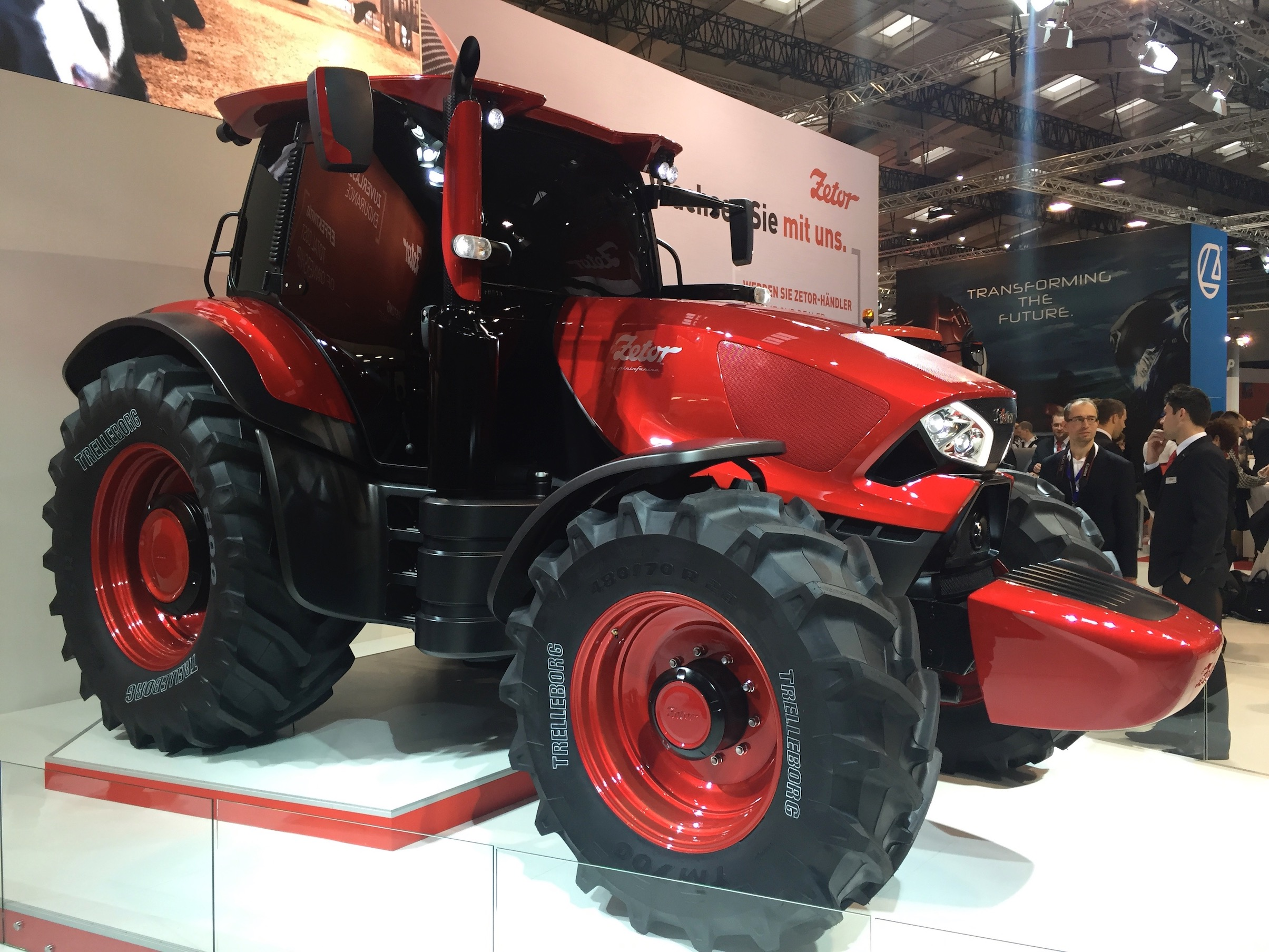
Zetor by Pininfarina

In 2015, at the Agritechnica exhibition in Hanover, Zetor introduced the design concept "Zetor by Pininfarina". The concept was applied to all products and model ranges of the Zetor brand. The BBC said of the Italian Pininfarina studio design that it is the most sexy tractor in the world.

== Other services ==
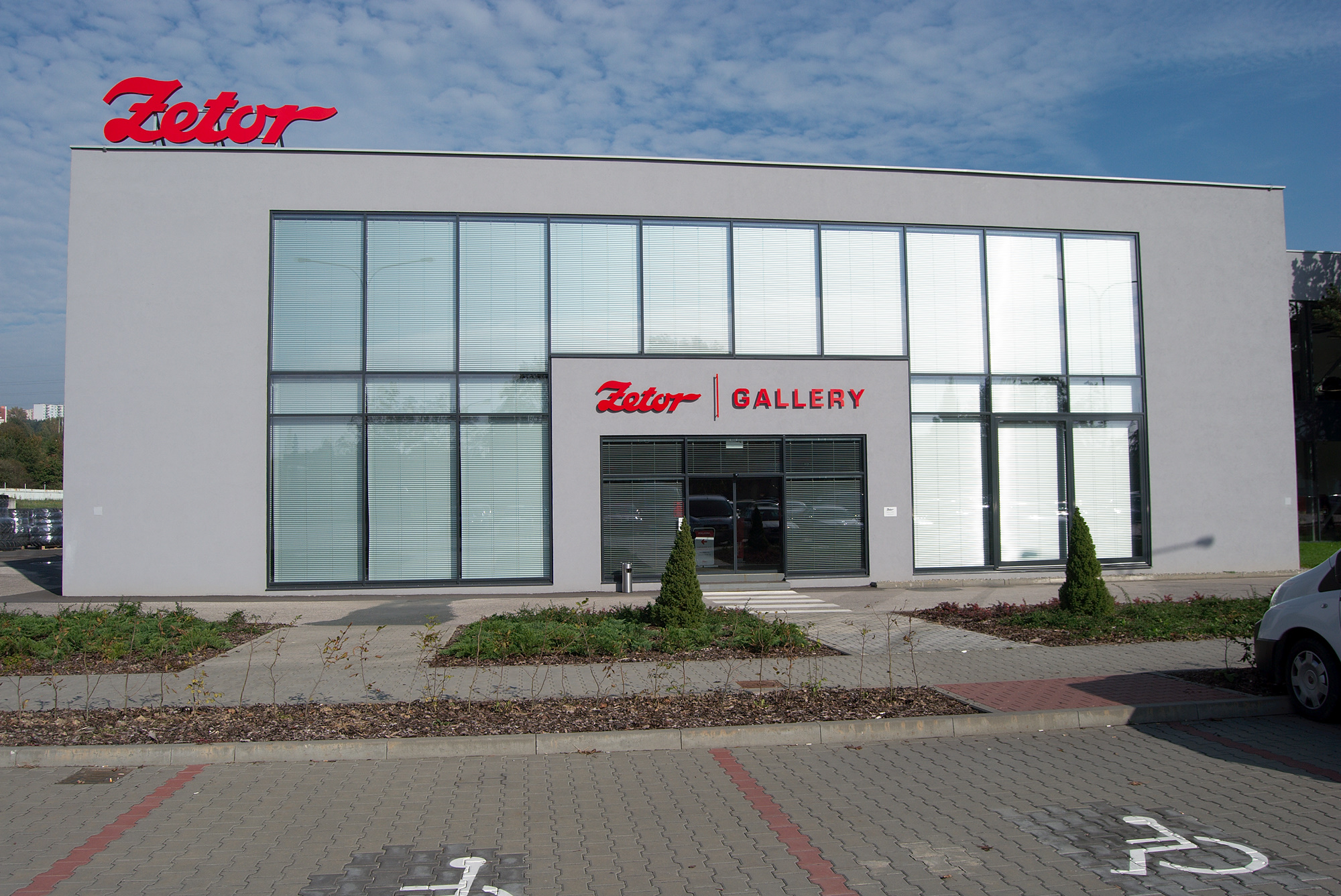
Zetor Gallery

=== Engines and components ===
Zetor also produces and sells individual engines and tractor components. Four-cylinder Zetor engines meet required emission standards, including the currently strictest Stage IV. It offers service and spare parts, which are supplied throughout the world. The Zetor stock currently includes over 20,000 original parts for all types of Zetor tractors, ranging from Unified Series I, II, and III, to current models. Thus, even tractors aged over 40 years have full service support. Zetor also produces original oils under the Zetor brand.

=== Front loaders ===
Zetor offers two ranges of front-end loader within the Zetor System. Front-end loaders marked ZL and ZX differ in size and lifting force, with both being compatible with all current Zetor tractors.

=== Zetor Gallery ===
13 June 2013 saw the ceremonial opening of the Zetor museum, called Zetor Gallery. The museum displayed tractors from the legendary Z25 up to the most current Crystal model, as well as the prototype of the forthcoming "Zetor by Pininfarina" tractors. Part of the museum is also a fan shop.
