= Mahindra Tractors =

Indian farm equipment manufacturer

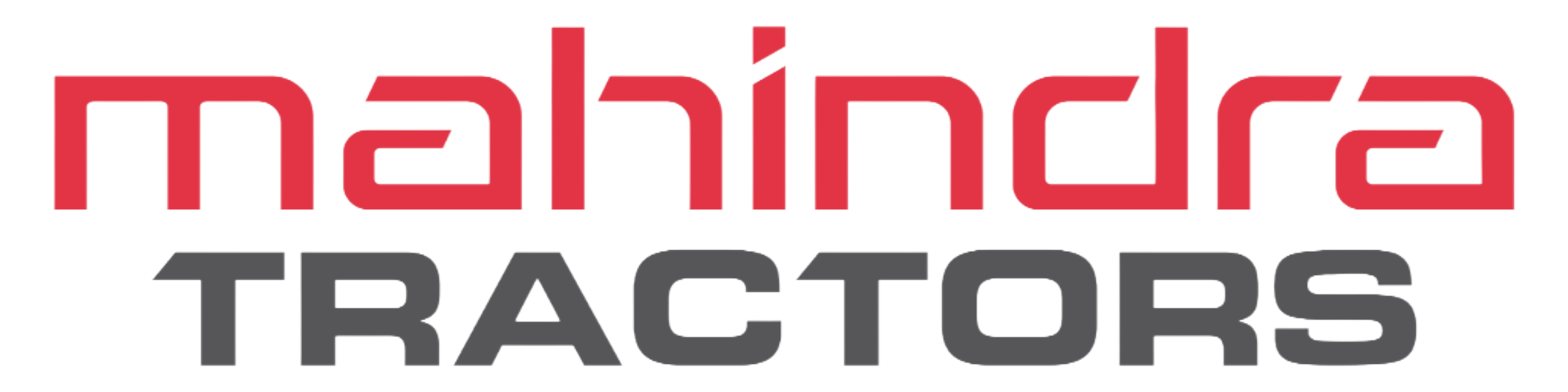
- Mahindra Tractor logo
- Type: Division
- Industry: Agricultural machinery
- Founded: 2 October 1947; 78 years ago Jassowal, Ludhiana, Punjab, India
- Founders: J. C. Mahindra; K. C. Mahindra; M. G. Muhammad
- Headquarters: Mumbai, Maharashtra, India
- Area served: Worldwide
- Key people: Anand Mahindra (Chairman); Dr. Anish Shah (MD & CEO); Pratap Bose (Chief Design Officer)
- Products: tractors
- Production output: 150,000 tractors/year
- Parent: Mahindra & Mahindra
- Subsidiaries: Sampo Rosenlew Oy; Mitsubishi Mahindra Agricultural Machinery (33.3%)
- Website: www.mahindratractor.com

Mahindra Tractors is an Indian agricultural machinery manufacturer. It is part of the Mahindra & Mahindra corporation. The company is the largest tractor manufacturer in India and has the capacity to build 150,000 tractors a year.

Founded in 1947, Mahindra Tractors is a division within the Farm Equipment Sector (FES) of the Mahindra Group. Over the past 60 years, the company has developed over 390 tractor models and maintains a network of more than 1,200 dealers across India.

Mahindra Tractors has received several national and state awards for its contributions to the agricultural machinery sector.

== History ==
J. C. Mahindra, K. C. Mahindra, and Malik Ghulam Muhammad founded Mahindra & Mahindra in 1945, in Ludhiana, Punjab. The company initially started as Muhammad & Mahindra but was renamed Mahindra & Mahindra in 1948. In 1947, Mahindra & Mahindra founded the Mahindra Tractor Company. In 1963, the company introduced its first tractor, the Mahindra B-275, as part of a joint venture with International Harvester. This collaboration aimed to manufacture tractors under the Mahindra brand for the Indian market. Mahindra Tractors sells around 85,000 units annually, making it among the largest tractor manufacturers worldwide. To expand in the Chinese market, Mahindra acquired a majority stake in Jiangling. Since 1983, Mahindra Tractors has been a significant player in the market. In 1999, Mahindra acquired a 60% stake in Gujarat Tractors from the Government of Gujarat, and these tractors are now known as Trakstar. The company formerly known as MGTL, is now Gromax Agri Equipment Ltd. In 2007, Mahindra acquired a majority stake in Punjab Tractors Ltd., which merged with Mahindra Tractors in 2009. The Swaraj brand name was retained and continues to be used for tractors in India.

To expand its presence in the U.S. market, Mahindra USA announced a sponsorship in the NASCAR Nationwide Series with R3 Motorsports, which is participating with a #23 Mahindra Tractors Chevrolet. The car was driven by Robert Richardson Jr. With this sponsorship, Mahindra became the first Indian company to sponsor a car in NASCAR. In 2008, Mahindra sponsored the MacDonald Motorsports team, which ran the #81 car in the NASCAR Nationwide Series. Mahindra later became a sponsor of Stewart-Haas Racing in the NASCAR Cup Series for driver Chase Briscoe.

== Products ==
Tractors

- Mahindra OJA
- Mahindra YUVRAJ
- Mahindra JIVO
- Mahindra XP PLUS
- Mahindra SP PLUS
- Mahindra YUVO TECH +
- Mahindra ARJUN
- Mahindra NOVO

== Mahindra operations ==
Mahindra Tractors has its largest customer base in India and China, with significant presence in the Indian Subcontinent, United States, Australia, Serbia, Chile, Syria, Iran, and parts of Africa. The company operates in China, North America, and Australia through its subsidiaries Jiangling, Mahindra USA, and Mahindra Australia. In India, it also has a presence through its subsidiaries Mahindra Gujarat and Swaraj.

=== Mahindra India ===
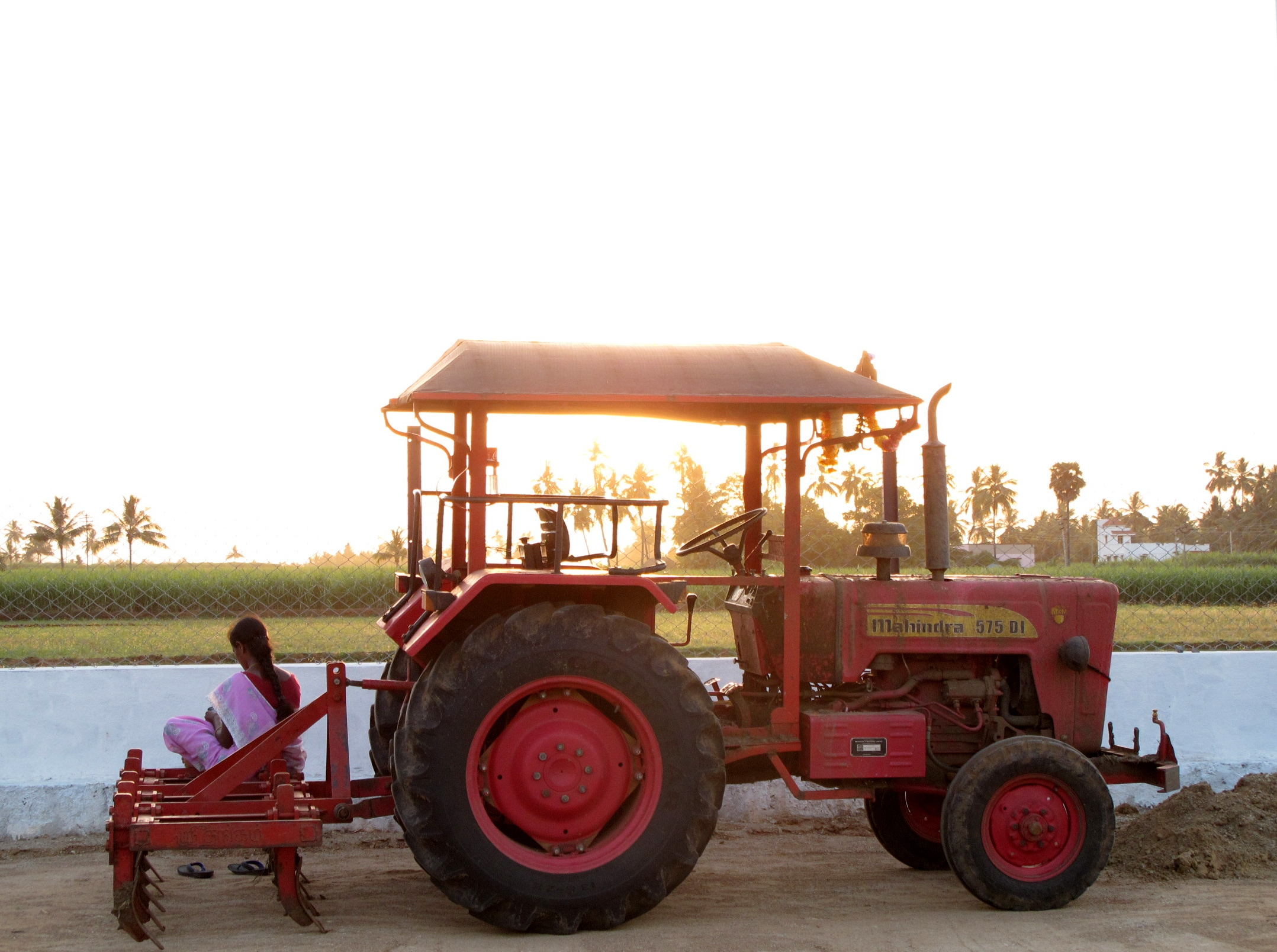
Mahindra 575 Di at sunset over a sugar cane field, Tamil Nadu, India

Mahindra Tractors is a major tractor manufacturer in India, which is the largest tractor market globally. It has been among the top sellers in the country since 1983. Its major sales occur in Gujarat, Haryana, Punjab, Maharashtra, and the southern states. In Gujarat, it operates under the name Mahindra Gujarat, and in Punjab, it is branded as Swaraj. In 1999, Mahindra acquired Gujarat Tractors from the Government of Gujarat and later purchased a 64.6% stake in Swaraj in 2004.

In 2011, Mahindra Tractors began manufacturing 15HP tractors under the brand name Yuvraj in Rajkot. The facility was established as a joint venture between Deepak Diesel Pvt Ltd and Mahindra & Mahindra, with a maximum production capacity of 30,000 tractors per year.

=== Mahindra USA ===
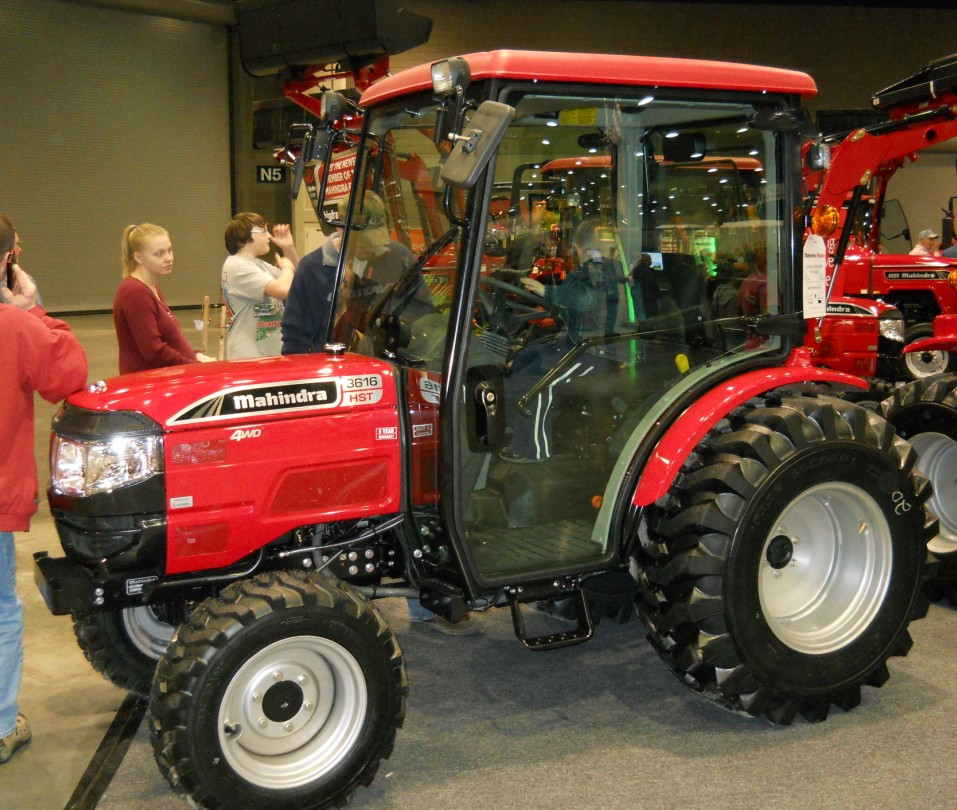
Mahindra 3616 HST MFWD is a Four wheel drive tractor sold in USA

In 1994, Mahindra entered the American market as Mahindra USA, establishing a sales and service network across the country. As a subsidiary of Mahindra Tractors, Mahindra USA manages sales in North America. The company operates five assembly plants in the United States: one at its North American headquarters in Houston, Texas; another in Marysville, California; and one in Chattanooga, Tennessee. In August 2012, Mahindra USA opened a fourth assembly and distribution center in Bloomsburg, Pennsylvania, followed by a fifth center in Lyons, Kansas, in 2014.

While Mahindra manufactures its own tractors, it also sources some models from other producers. For the U.S. market, Mahindra obtains certain tractors from Tong Yang Moolsan, a tractor manufacturer based in South Korea.

=== Mahindra Australia ===
Based in Brisbane, Mahindra Australia is a branch of Mahindra & Mahindra Ltd. In 2005, the company entered the Australian market with the launch of its assembly & customer support centre in Acacia Ridge, QLD. Currently, the company's products are sold and serviced by 40 dealers throughout Australia. Mahindra Australia is also responsible for sales in New Zealand and the rest of Australasia. The Company's products are distributed in Fiji by Carpenters Motors. In Western Australia and South Australia, Mahindra tractors are distributed by McIntosh Distribution.

Mahindra Australia, based in Brisbane, is a subsidiary of Mahindra & Mahindra Ltd. The company began operations in Australia in 2005 with an assembly and customer support center in Acacia Ridge, Queensland. Mahindra’s products are available through a network of 40 dealers across Australia. The company also oversees sales in New Zealand and other parts of Australasia. In Fiji, Carpenters Motors manages the distribution of Mahindra products, while McIntosh Distribution handles distribution in Western Australia and South Australia.

=== Mahindra China ===
In 2004, Mahindra acquired an 80% stake in Jiangling Tractors Company from Jiangling Motors in China for $8 million, renaming it Mahindra (China) Tractors Company Limited (MCTCL). In February 2009, Mahindra formed a joint venture by purchasing stakes in Jiangsu Yueda Yancheng Tractors Company Limited from Jiangsu Yueda Group, which was later renamed Mahindra Yueda Yancheng Tractors Company Limited (MYYTCL). In 2012, Mahindra consolidated its Chinese ventures by acquiring 88.55% of MCTCL from Mahindra Overseas Investment (Mauritius) Company Ltd., making it a subsidiary of MYYTCL.

After operating for over five years, Mahindra sold its 51% stake in the joint venture with Jiangsu Yueda Group for ¥82 million. The company announced plans to establish independent operations in the Chinese market.

== Brands ==
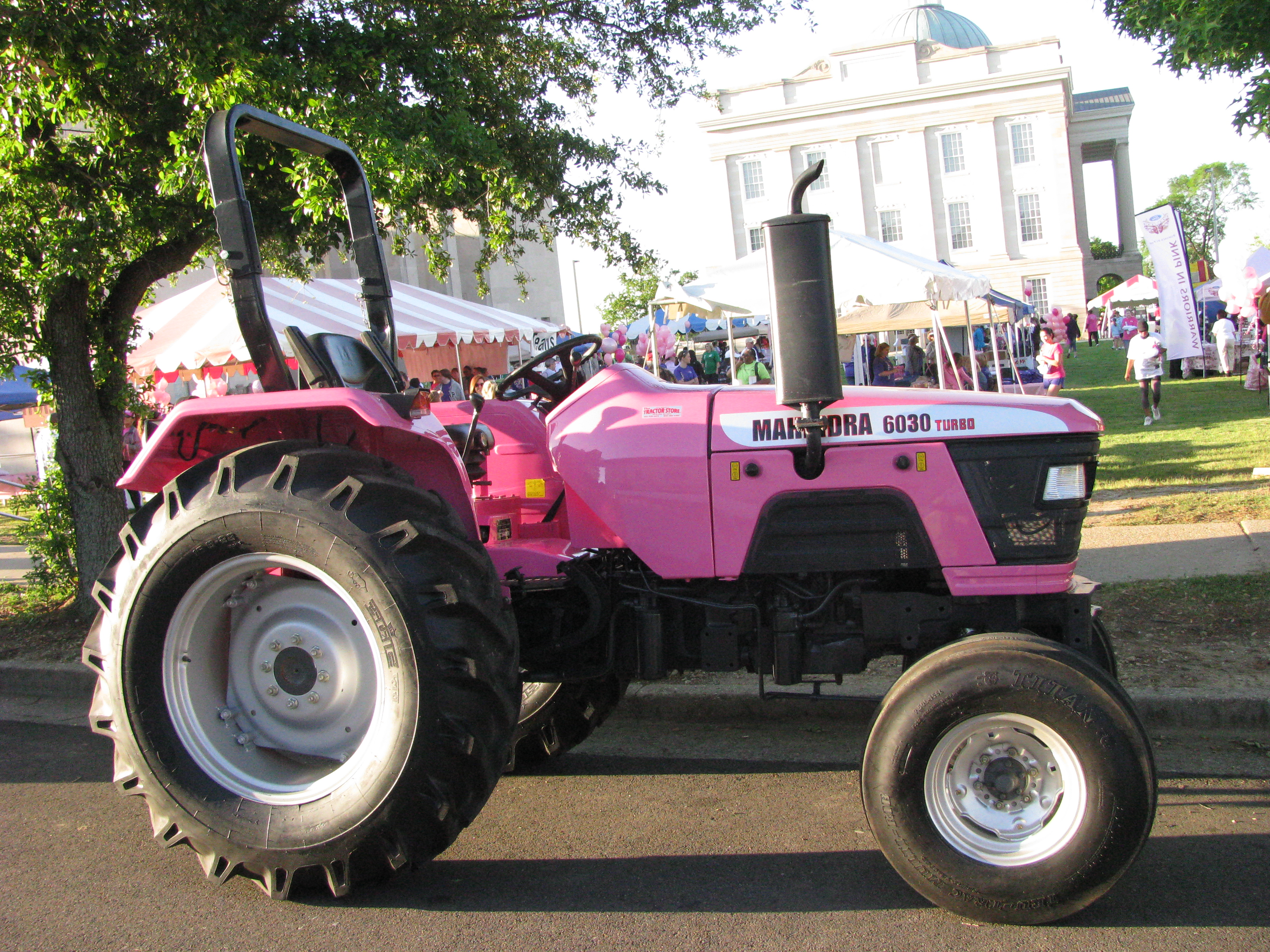

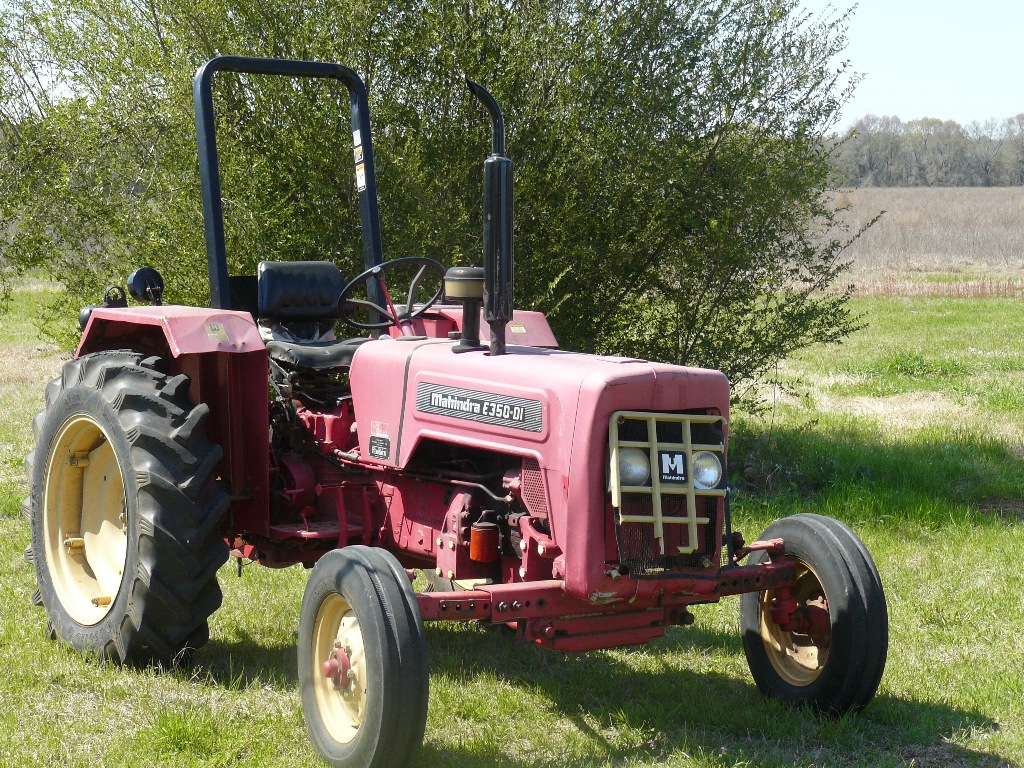

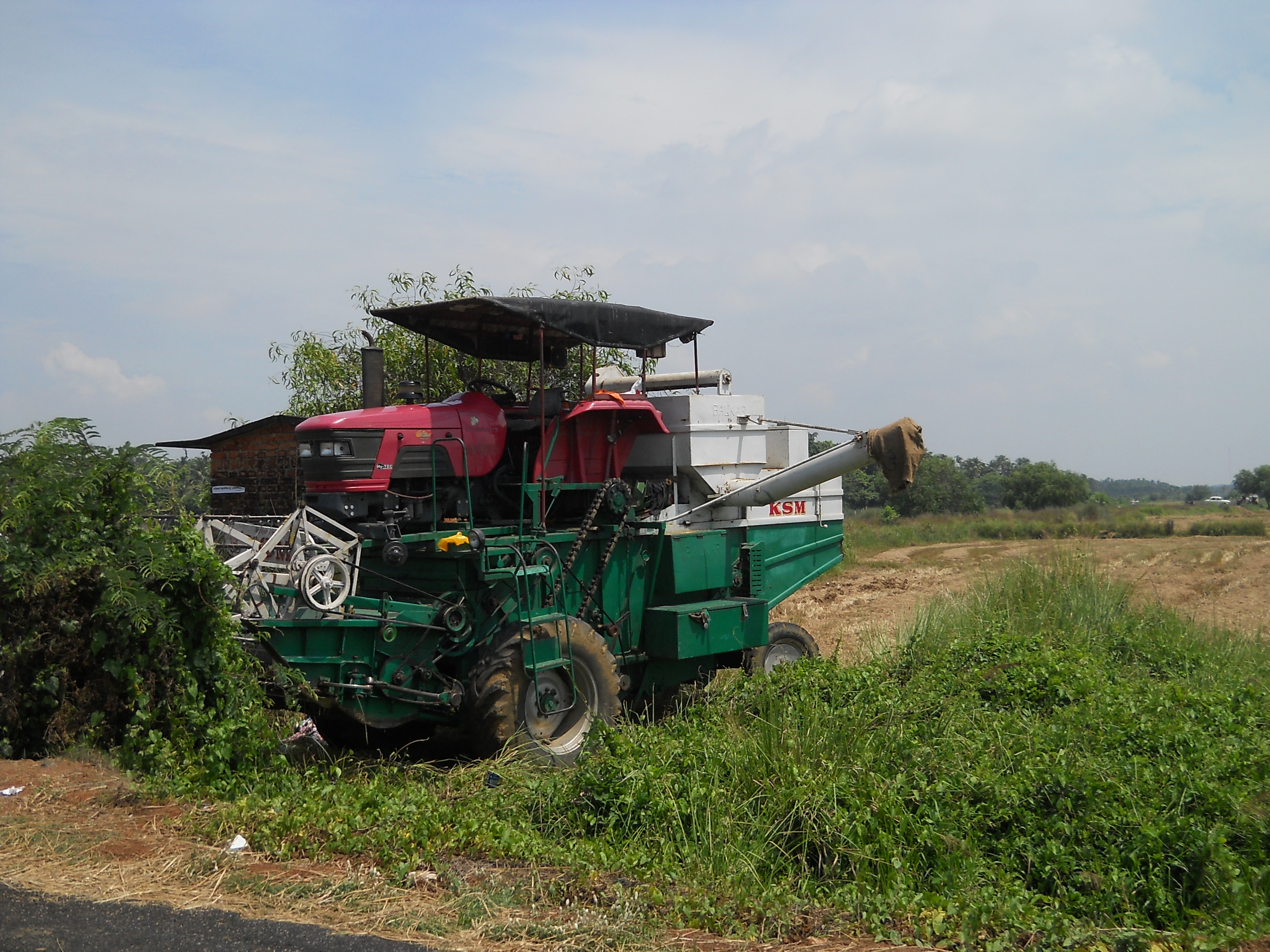

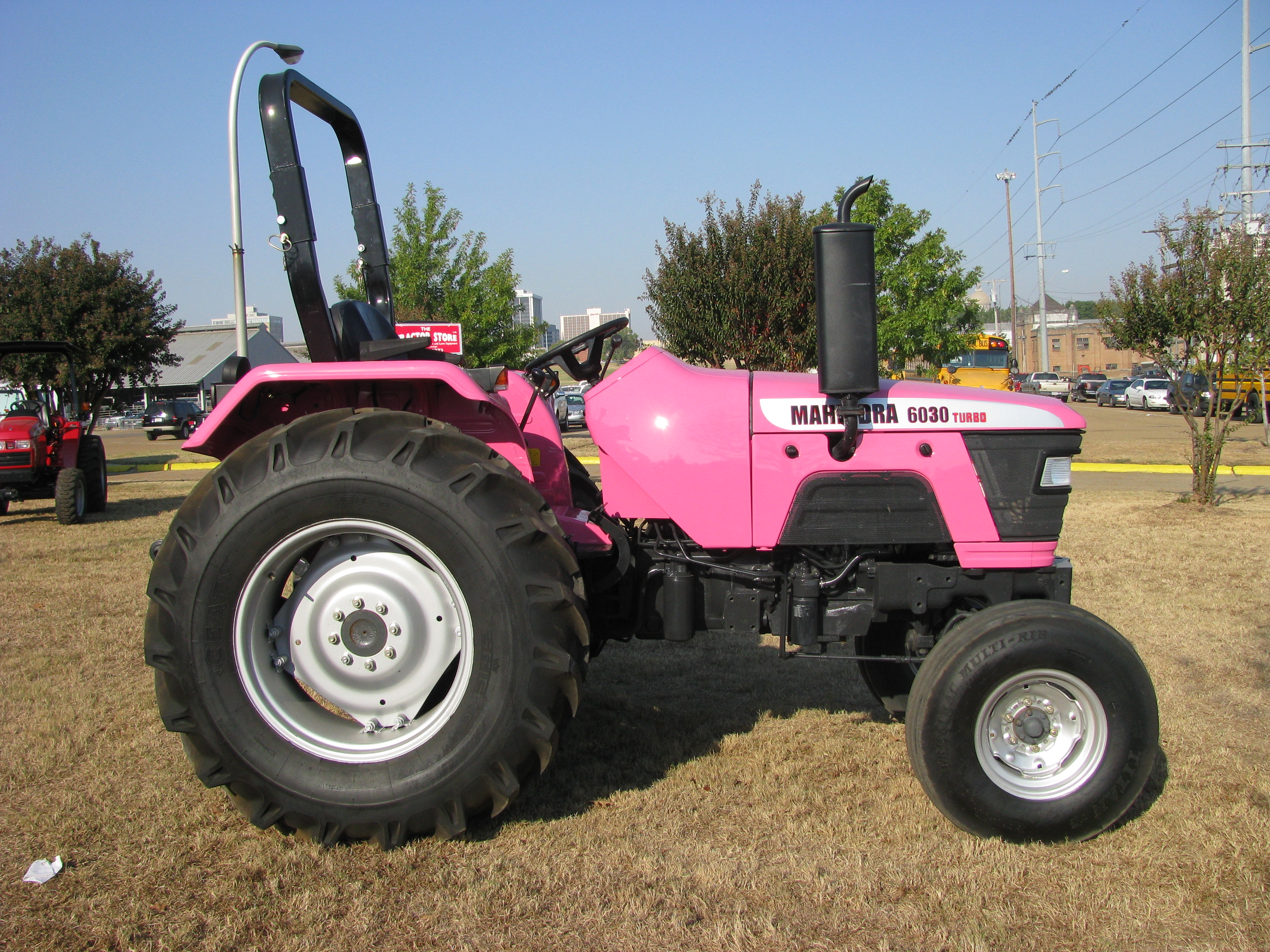
- Mahindra India
  - Swaraj
  - Trakstar - Gromax Agri Equipment Ltd.
- ITMCO-Mahindra
- Jiangling
  - FengShou
  - Lenar
- Mahindra Agribusiness - founded in 2000 to incorporate the entire food chain.

== Mahindra assembly plants ==
=== Domestic (India) ===
- Mumbai, Maharashtra
- Nagpur, Maharashtra
- Mohali, Punjab
- Jaipur, Rajasthan
- Rudrapur, Uttarakhand
- Zahirabad, Telangana
- Rajkot, Gujarat
- Vadodara, Gujarat
- Amreli, Gujarat

=== Mahindra Australia ===
- Brisbane, Australia

=== United States ===
- Houston, Texas
- Marysville, California
- Bloomsburg, Pennsylvania
- Lyons, Kansas
- Detroit, Michigan ( R&D Plant )

=== Africa ===
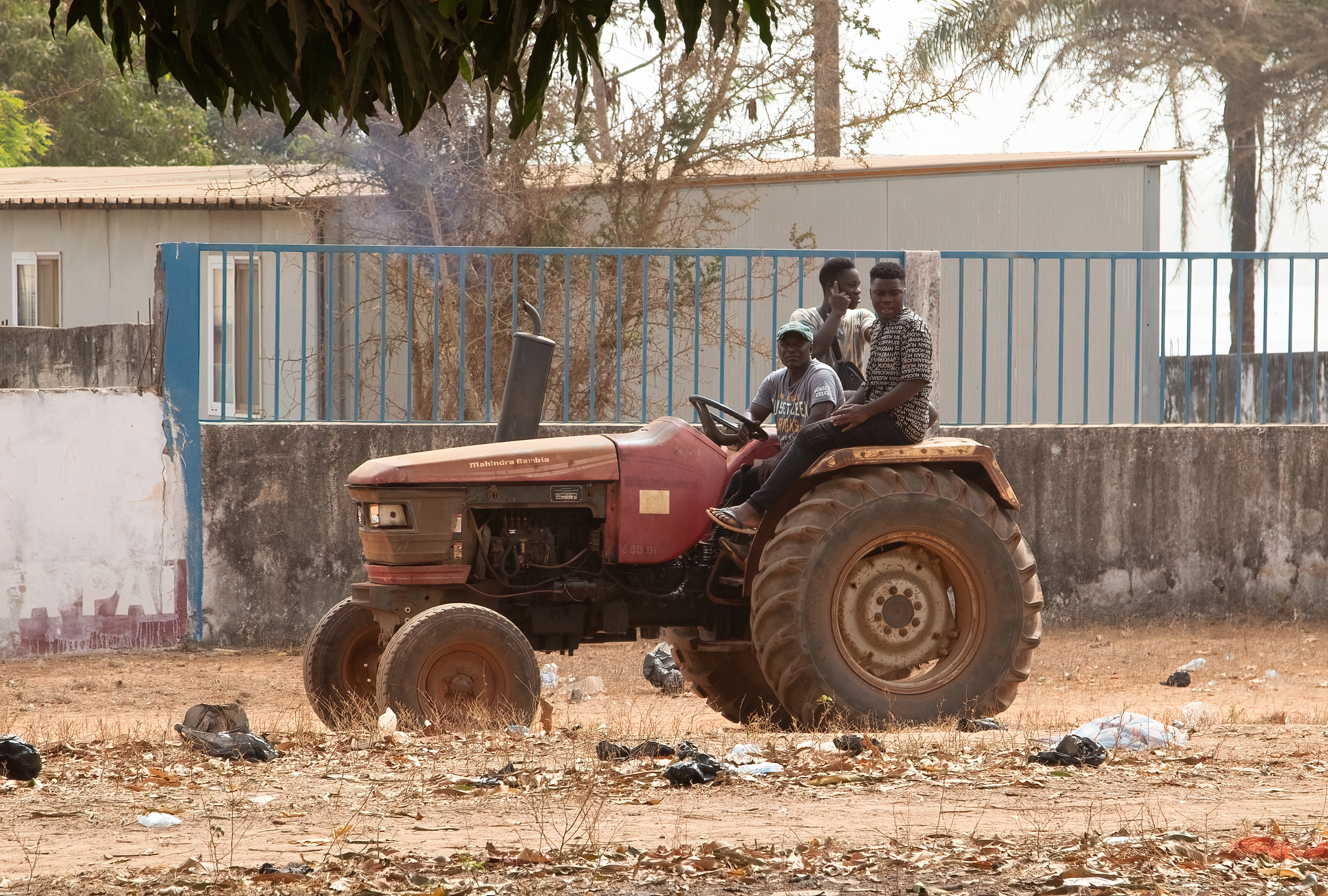
Mahindra Gambia tractor, Bijagos Archipelago, Guinea-Bissau, tractor was made in Gambia plant.

- Chad
- Gambia
- Mali
- Nigeria
- Ghana
- Benin
- Somalia

== Awards and recognition ==
In 2003, Mahindra & Mahindra's Farm Equipment Sector (FES) was awarded the deming application prize. In 2007, Mahindra received the Japan Quality Medal, awarded to organizations for total quality management.
