= Mahindra Blues Festival =

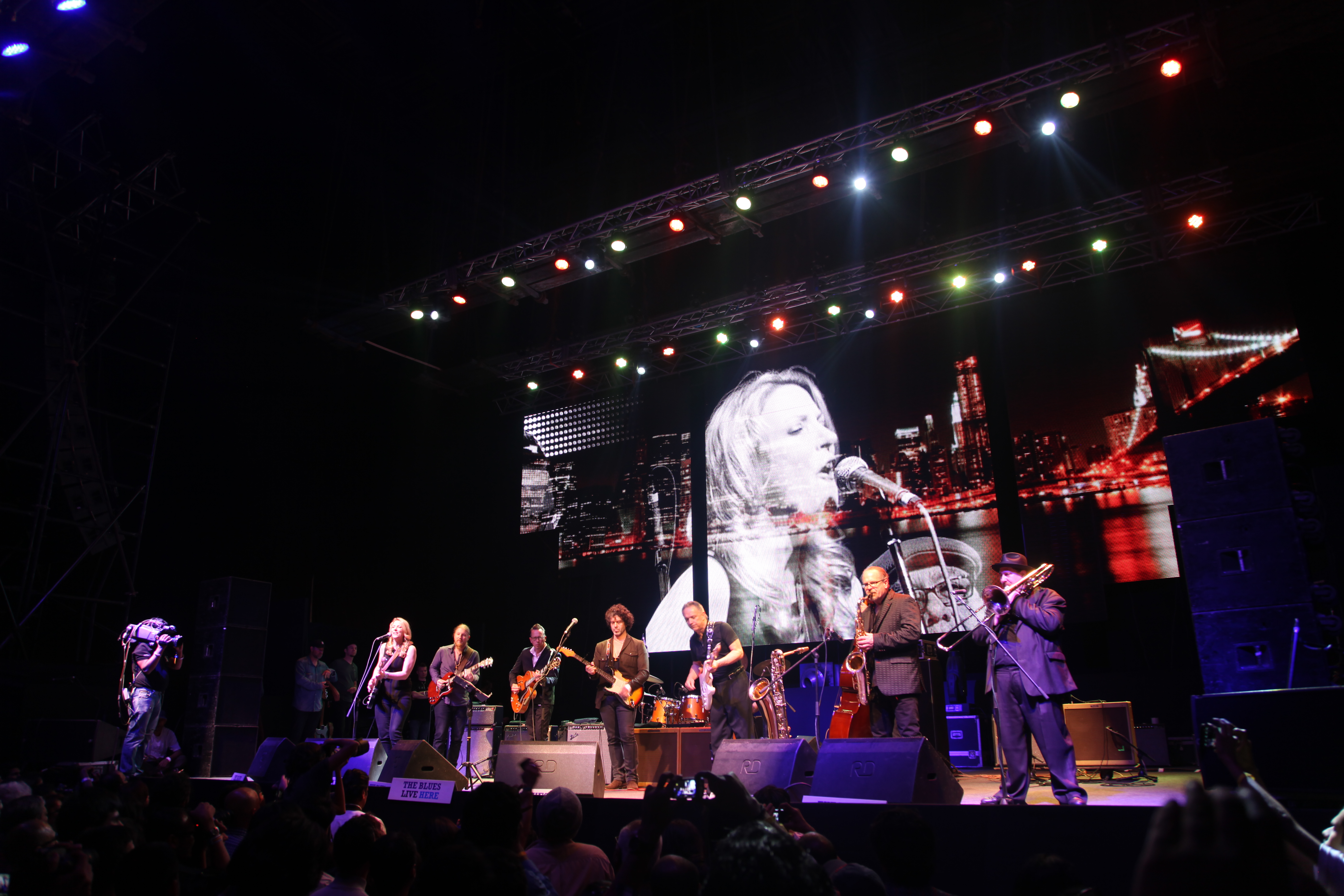
- Status: Active
- Genre: Music Festival
- Venue: Mehboob Studios
- Locations: Bandra, Mumbai
- Country: India
- Inaugurated: 2011
- Most recent: 2020
- Organizer: Mahindra Group
- Website: www.mahindrablues.com

Mahindra Blues Festival (MBF) is an annual blues music festival that happens in February at Mehboob Studios, Bandra, Mumbai. Senior musicians who have performed here at this festival over the past years include Buddy Guy, Walter Trout, and John Mayall.

== History ==
Spearheaded by Anand Mahindra, Vice-chairman and managing director of the Mahindra Group, with VG Jairaman, the co-founder of Oranjuice Entertainment serving as festival director, the inaugural edition of the Mahindra Blues festival took place on 5–6 February 2011, at Mumbai's Mehboob Studios. This first edition of the festival was headlined by Chicago Blues musician Buddy Guy, who is reported to have pledged his support to the endeavor without hesitation. At the culmination of his two-hour-long set, he invited the other musicians who had performed across the two days to join him on stage for an impromptu jam. Since then, the festival is closed each year with an all-star jam featuring that year's headlining artists.

Although the festival has attracted a number of prominent blues musicians over the years, Guy remains an integral part of the festival. He has headlined several editions of the festival, including its 10th anniversary in 2020. One of the festival venue's three stages has also been named the "Polka Dot Parlour" in honor of the musician's polka dotted guitar and shirts.

Apart from the international musicians who grace the stage each year, local stalwarts including Blackstratblues and Soulmate are regular features in the line-up.

In 2015, for its fifth edition, the Mahindra Blues Festival inaugurated a new tradition - the Mahindra Blues Band Hunt. This annual competition recognizes local talent. The winners of the Band Hunt are given the opportunity to perform at the Garden Stage between the headlining sets in that year's edition of the festival.

In 2020, for the festival's 10th anniversary, Oranjuice Entertainment teamed up with the Indian NGO Nanhi Kali for their "Blues in Schools initiative". The Mahindra Blues team taught school girls from underprivileged backgrounds how to play the harmonica. 11 of these students were chosen to perform at the festival on the Garden Stage.

== Performers ==
Year	International artistes	Homegrown artistes	Band Hunt Winner
2020	Buddy Guy; Keb' Mo'; Kenny Wayne Shepherd Band; Larkin Poe	The Homegrown Blues Collective	Quiet Storm
2019	Beth Hart; Charlie Musselwhite; Brandon Santini; Sugaray Rayford		Blue Temptation
2018	John Mayall; Coco Montoya; Walter "Wolfman" Washington & The Roadmaster; Layla Zoe	Blackstratblues	Arinjoy Trio
2017	Quinn Sullivan; Shemekia Copeland; Supersonic Blues Machine; Janiva Magness		BLU
2016	Joss Stone; Malina Moye; Keb Mo; The Heritage Blues Orchestra; King King	Soulmate	Lal and the People
2015	Buddy Guy; Quinn Sullivan; Doyle Bramhall II; Rich Robinson of The Black Crowes; Nikki Hill; Thorbjørn Risager	Blackstratblues	Aayushi Karnik
2014	Zac Harmon; Lil' Ed Williams & The Blues Imperials; Jimmie Vaughan; Doyle Bramhall; Tedeschi Trucks Band	Soulmate; Blackstratblues	-
2013	Popa Chubby; Robert Randolph and The Family Band; Walter Trout; Dana Fuchs	Big Band Blues; Soulmate	-
2012	John Lee Hooker Jr.; Taj Mahal Trio; Ana Popović; Buddy Guy; Robert Randolph	Soulmate; Blackstratblues; Overdrive Trio	-
2011	Jonny Lang; Shemekia Copeland; Buddy Guy; Matt Schofield	Soulmate; Saturday Night Blues Band; The Luke Kenny Mojo Jukebox	-
