= Project Gyanodaya =

Online tutoring platform

Gyanodaya is an e-learning platform launched by Godda District Administration of Government of Jharkhand in collaboration with Eckovation and Adani Foundation. Under this program, the state government schools in the tribal areas of Jharkhand are connected with smart classroom.

== History ==
The project was launched in 2018 to encourage students to attend schools regularly to solve the problem of absenteeism which is a major issue due to onset of monsoon. This initiative also aims to provide online education in government schools for class 6 to 12 in subjects like science and mathematics.

=== COVID-19 Disruption ===
During the COVID-19 disruption in 2020 when schools were closed as a part of state's pandemic mitigating guidelines, the online classes model by Gyanodaya was broadcast on Doordarshan's DD Jharkhand channel as a part of state government’s efforts to continue education, reaching out to over 5 million students in the state.

During COVID-19 pandemic, the state government distributed 43,977 tablets via Project Gyanodaya to 38,000 state-run schools.

== Recognition ==
In June 2021, the United Nations Development Programme, India's 'Aspirational District Programme: An Appraisal' that measures the impact of flagship programmes making defining difference to sustainable development goals, recognized the Gyanodaya platform for mitigating urban-rural divides through digital education.

== See also ==
- Project Nanhi Kali, an Indian non-governmental organisation
- Project Sarvoday
- Khan Academy
