= Dilip G Shah =

Dilip Girdharlal Shah, commonly known as DG Shah, was a pharmaceutical executive who founded the Indian Pharmaceutical Alliance. Shah was a member of the first batch of the Indian Institute of Management, Ahmedabad (IIMA), which graduated in 1966. At IIMA, Shah met Smita Dalal, whom he eventually married. They are considered to be the first couple in the history of IIMA. Upon graduation, Shah started worked for Pfizer in 1967. He worked for Pfizer for 30 years as a Commercial Director and eventually became a member of the board of directors for Pfizer-India. Shah's son Anish Shah serves as the MD & CEO for the Mahindra Group.

In 1999, Shah founded the Indian Pharmaceutical Alliance (IPA) to promote the cause of generic drugs in India and to oppose the drug intellectual property rights defined by the TRIPS Agreement. Divya Rajgopal, writing for The Economic Times, notes that:

Shah and the IPA became the body that resisted the Intellectual Property Rights that lower income countries like India were forced to sign under the World Trade Organisation's TRIPS agreement. The IPA positioned itself as the voice of generic drug companies that claimed to represent the interests of Indian drug companies who were bullied under these TRIPS agreement. Shah, few pharma industry veterans recall was at times even more powerful than the Indian CEO's whose interests he represented to the bureaucrats and ministers in Delhi.

With the IPA, Shah helped Indian companies communicate with the US Food and Drug Administration (USFDA) and contributed "in the shaping of the current Indian patent law, which favours affordable medicines, while also recognising the obligations under the TRIPS agreement". Shah was a member of the official Indian delegation for the World Trade Organization (WTO) ministerial conference at Cancun and testified on behalf of India in an appearance before the United States International Trade Commission (USITC). He also was the author of the first book on drug pricing in India.

Apart from his work with the IPA, Shah set up a company called Vision Consulting Group to consult about matters of public policy, strategy, and planning and served in a variety of advisory roles. He was the Chair of the International Generic Pharmaceutical Alliance (IGPA) for two terms in 2005-07 and 2010-11, a Non-Executive Independent Director of Fresenius Kabi Oncology Limited (formerly Dabur Pharma Limited), an Independent Non-Executive Director at Anuh Pharma Ltd. (October 2007-February 2019), a member of the advisory panel for PharmaGenerics UK, an Additional Director of Lyka Labs Ltd. (from July 2008 to April 2009), an editor for the Journal of Generics Medicines, and a guest faculty for the Management Development Programmes at his alma mater IIMA.

Shah died on 22 February 2019. The "DG Shah Award for best Public Policy Paper" at IIMA was posthumously established in his name.
