= Anish Shah =

Anish Shah may refer to:

- Anish Shah (comedian)
- Anish Shah (businessman)
