= Project Sarvoday =

Government initiativein Haryana, India

- Sarvoday Gramin Vikaas Program
- Country: India
- Launched: 16 July 2023; 2 years ago Taoru, Nuh district, Haryana
- Status: Active

Project Sarvoday (also known as Sarvoday Gramin Vikaas Program) is an initiative of the M3M Foundation. It is part of the Government of Haryana's integrated village development program. Under this initiative, villages in the state are being selected to receive support in education, health, skill development, and environmental programs.

== History ==
The project was initially tested by the M3M Foundation as a pilot in 2020 with 13 villages in Odisha, aiming to make them self-sustainable within the next three years.

Later, in 2023, the project was adapted in Haryana, and it got a formal structure by expanding to Taoru, a town in the Nuh district of Haryana, with 81 villages in focus. In Phase 1, 30 Village Management and Development Committees (VMDCs) were constituted, including the Sarpanch, panches, and local villagers who are experts in the fields of education, health, skill development, and the environment. The project's primary focus is to provide renewable energy sources like solar power, potable drinking water, and water conservation and strengthen the existing primary healthcare system.

In Phase 2, the project will be extended to 150 villages in Haryana.

== See also ==
- Project Gyanodaya
- Project Nanhi Kali
