= Soulmate (disambiguation) =

A soulmate is a person with whom one has a feeling of deep or natural affinity.

Soulmate may also refer to:

== Film ==
- Soul Mate (2002 film), an Italian fantasy-comedy
- Soulmate (2013 film), a British horror
- Soul Mate (2016 film), a Chinese romantic drama
  - Soulmate (2023 film), a South Korean adaptation
- The Soul-Mate, a 2018 South Korean comedy-drama
- Soulm8te, an upcoming American science fiction erotic thriller

== Music ==
- Soulmate (band), a blues band from Shillong, India

=== Albums ===
- Soulmate (album), a 2009 album by jacksoul

=== Songs ===
- "Soulmate" (Natasha Bedingfield song), 2007
- "SoulMate", by Justin Timberlake, 2018
- "Soulmate", a song by Mac Miller from The Divine Feminine, 2016
- "Soulmate", a song by Lizzo from Cuz I Love You, 2019
- "Soulmate", a song by Wee Papa Girl Rappers, 1998
- "Soul Mate", a song by Flora Cash, 2021
- "Soulmate", a song by Audio Adrenaline from Don't Censor Me, 1993
- "Soulmate", a song by Kasabian from Act III, 2026

== Television ==
- Soul Mate (TV series), a 2026 Japanese romance BL series
- "The Soul Mate", a 1996 episode of Seinfeld

== See also ==
- Soul Mates (disambiguation)
