= List of Indian automotive companies =

The list of Indian automotive companies collects both extant and historic automotive companies largely associated with India.

== Indian car brands ==
- Tata Motors
- Mahindra & Mahindra
- Ssangyong
- Force Motors

== Multiutility brands ==
- Eicher Motors
- Ashok Leyland
- Swaraj Mazda
