= Mahindra University =

Private university in Telangana, India

- Type: Private
- Established: 2014; 12 years ago
- Affiliations: UGC
- Chancellor: Anand Mahindra
- Vice-Chancellor: Yajulu Medury
- Location: Hyderabad, Telangana, India
- Website: www.mahindrauniversity.edu.in

Mahindra University is a private university located in Hyderabad, Telangana, India. It is owned and operated by the Mahindra Group and its various subsidiaries.

In 2024, the university received 103 acres land and 17 buildings with built-up area of 1,261,149 sq.ft. in Hyderabad, Telangana from Tech Mahindra as a cash consideration of Rs 535 crore.

== Courses ==
The university offers various programmes. A two-year MJMC programme admission requires a bachelor’s degree, followed by an entrance examination and interview. The M.Des programme requires candidates with professional experience. The M.Tech programme offers specialisations in Artificial Intelligence, Robotics and Wireless Communication. The two-year MA programme is open to graduates, including candidates with B.Ed. or B.El.Ed. degrees.

The three-year LL.B. (Hons.) programme requires a minimum of 60% aggregate marks and accepted scores from examinations such as CLAT (PG) or LSAT (PG). The MBA programme offers specialisations in Business Analytics, Finance and Digital Business. The admission is based on scores from GMAT, CAT, GRE or the university's MUMET examination. The university also offers postgraduate teaching assistantships, which could include a monthly stipend of ₹18,000 or free accommodation.

== Academic partnerships ==
Mahindra University has made academic and research collaborations with different universities and organisations in India and abroad. In 2024, it partnered with Australia's La Trobe University for a joint Civil Engineering degree, student and faculty exchanges and research collaboration. The arrangement allowed students to complete the final two years of their undergraduate studies at La Trobe University.

In September 2025, the university signed an MoU with Australia's Monash University for collaborative research, academic exchanges and a 2+2 programme, under which students could complete the final two years of their studies at Monash University. The same year, Mahindra University partnered with Japan's Kagawa University for student and faculty exchanges and joint research.

In September 2025, Mahindra University partnered with Apollo Healthcare Academy to start bachelor's programmes in Allied Health Sciences. In January 2026, it signed an MoU with IIT Hyderabad for research, education and training in areas including critical minerals, sustainable mining and advanced industrial processes. In April 2026, the university signed an MoU with Temple University in the United States for a dual bachelor's–master's programme, student and faculty exchanges, joint research and curriculum development.

== Controversies ==
In 2025, four people were arrested after allegations of operating a drug racket in the Mahindra University campus in Hyderabad. Around 50 students were reportedly being investigated over suspected links to the racket. The investigation was conducted by the Telangana Anti-Narcotics Bureau and the Telangana Police.

Following the allegations, members of the Akhil Bharatiya Vidyarthi Parishad staged a protest at the university campus. They called for action against those allegedly involved and demanded the arrest of the university's vice-chancellor, holding the administration responsible for the incident.

== Incidents ==
In December 2021, Mahindra University temporarily closed its campus in Hyderabad after several students and staff members tested positive for COVID-19. According to reports, 25 students and five staff members were infected, following which the university suspended on-campus activities. The affected students and staff were placed under appropriate isolation and monitoring.
