= Keshub Mahindra =

Indian businessman (1923–2023)

- Born: 9 October 1923; Shimla, Hill States, British India
- Died: 12 April 2023 (aged 99); Mumbai, Maharashtra, India
- Education: Wharton School of the University of Pennsylvania
- Occupation: Businessman
- Title: Chairman Emeritus, Mahindra Group
- Term: 1963–2012
- Spouse: Sudha Mahindra (m. 1956)
- Children: 3
- Website: Keshub Mahindra

Keshub Mahindra (9 October 1923 – 12 April 2023) was an Indian businessman and the chairman emeritus of the Mahindra Group, a diversified Indian conglomerate with interests spanning automobiles, software services, hospitality, aerospace and defence. He was the son of K. C. Mahindra, the co-founder of the Mahindra Group. Mahindra retired as chairman in August 2012 after heading the group for nearly five decades, handing over the position to his nephew, Anand Mahindra.

Mahindra served on the boards of many Indian companies including Tata Chemicals, Steel Authority of India, Indian Hotels Company Limited, ICICI Bank, and Tata Steel. He was the founding chairman of Housing and Urban Development Corporation, an Indian public sector undertaking focused on housing finance and infrastructure project finance.

== Biography ==
Mahindra was born on 9 October 1923 in Shimla, in the present-day Indian state of Himachal Pradesh. His father was the industrialist K. C. Mahindra. He graduated with a bachelor's degree from the Wharton School at the University of Pennsylvania in the United States before returning to India to join Mahindra & Mahindra, a company co-founded by his father Kailash Chandra Mahindra, in 1947. The company started as a steel trading company and later ventured into manufacturing automobiles in a partnership with Willys to manufacture its Jeep brand of automobiles in India. At the same time the company partnered with International Harvester to launch their tractors in India. Mahindra took over as the company's chairman in 1963 and held the position until his retirement in 2012. During this time, he led the company's partnerships with corporations including International Harvester, British Telecom, Ford Motor Company, and the Mitsubishi Group. At the time of his retirement, when he handed over leadership of the company to his nephew Anand Mahindra, the company was a diversified Conglomerate with interests in software services, aerospace and defence, real estate, and hospitality.

Mahindra was appointed by the government of India to serve on various committees, including the Sachar Commission on Company Law & MRTP, Central Advisory Council of Industries. In 1987, he was awarded the Chevalier de l'Ordre National de la Légion d'honneur by the French government. From 2004 to 2010, he was a member of the prime minister's Council on Trade & Industry, under the then prime minister Manmohan Singh.

Mahindra was a member of the Apex Advisory Council of ASSOCHAM and was the president emeritus of the Employers' Federation of India. He was an honorary fellow of the All-India Management Association, New Delhi and a member of the Council of the United World Colleges (International) in the United Kingdom. Mahindra was also on the board of other Indian companies including Tata Chemicals, Steel Authority of India, Indian Hotels Company Limited, ICICI Bank, and Tata Steel. He was the founding member and served as the chairman of Housing and Urban Development Corporation, an Indian public sector undertaking focused on housing finance and infrastructure project finance. He had also served as the director of Bombay Dyeing and the Burmah Trading Corporation.

Mahindra was a proponent of good governance and ethics and has stated his views in several publications and forums, including in an interview for the Creating Emerging Markets project at the Harvard Business School, during which he talks about the Mahindra Group's evolution into a global business group and his determination never to compromise on high ethical values. Mahindra also served as the chairman of the Indian Institute of Management Ahmedabad between 1975 and 1985.

Mahindra was awarded the Lifetime Achievement Award in 2007 by Ernst & Young. He was awarded the Frost and Sullivan Award for Leadership, Innovation and Growth in 2015. He declined the Padma Bhushan, India's third-highest civilian honour, in 2002.

=== Controversy ===
Mahindra had served as the non-executive chairman of Union Carbide India Limited at the time the Bhopal disaster took place in December 1984, in which 3,787 people died. That week, Mahindra and two other senior executives were arrested then bailed on charges including culpable homicide. In February 1989, the Supreme Court of India ordered Mahindra's company to pay $470 million in damages to the victims. Later estimated deaths from the gas leak exposure range from 10,000 to over 15,000 victims.

In June 2010, Mahindra along with six other former employees of the Union Carbide subsidiary, all Indian nationals and many in their 70s, were sentenced to two years imprisonment and fined ₹1,00,000 (US$1,636). All were given bail shortly after the verdict.

== Personal life ==
Mahindra was married to Sudha Mahindra in 1956. The couple had three daughters. Mahindra died on 12 April 2023, at age 99.

== Book(s) ==
- Mahindra, Keshub (1973). Manager in Wonderland. Hyderabad: Administrative Staff College of India. OCLC 2317458.
