= Soul Mates =

Soul Mates may refer to:

- Soul Mates (TV series), a 2014 Australian television comedy series
- Soulmates (TV series), a 2020 American television anthology series
- "Soul Mates" (Babylon 5), a 1994 episode of television series Babylon 5
- Soul Mates (album), a jazz album by saxophonists Charlie Rouse and Sahib Shihab
- Soul Mates (1925 film), a silent drama
- Soulmates (1997 film), an American drama film
- Soul Mates (2023 French film), a French drama
- Soul Mates (2023 American film), an American horror-thriller film
- Soul Mates, a 1913 film directed by Gilbert P. Hamilton
- Soul Mates, a song by Grant Nicholas on Yorktown Heights

== See also ==
- Soulmate (disambiguation)
