= Club Mahindra Holidays =

Indian holiday resort operator

Mahindra Holidays & Resorts India Ltd. (MHRIL)
- Company type: Public
- Traded as: NSE: MHRIL; BSE: 533088
- Industry: Hospitality
- Founded: September 20, 1996; 29 years ago
- Headquarters: India
- Area served: Worldwide
- Key people: C.P. Gurnani (Chairman); Manoj Bhat (MD and CEO)
- Products: Vacation Ownership (VO)
- Revenue: ▲₹2,623 crore (US$270 million) (2023)
- Operating income: ▲₹761 crore (US$79 million) (2023)
- Net income: ▲₹115 crore (US$12 million) (2023)
- Total assets: ▲₹9,317 crore (US$970 million) (2023)
- Total equity: ▲₹390 crore (US$41 million) (2023)
- Parent: Mahindra Group
- Website: www.clubmahindra.com

Club Mahindra is an Indian hospitality company established on 20 September 1996. It is a subsidiary of the Mahindra Group and operates a timeshare network of resorts across India and internationally.

== Resorts ==
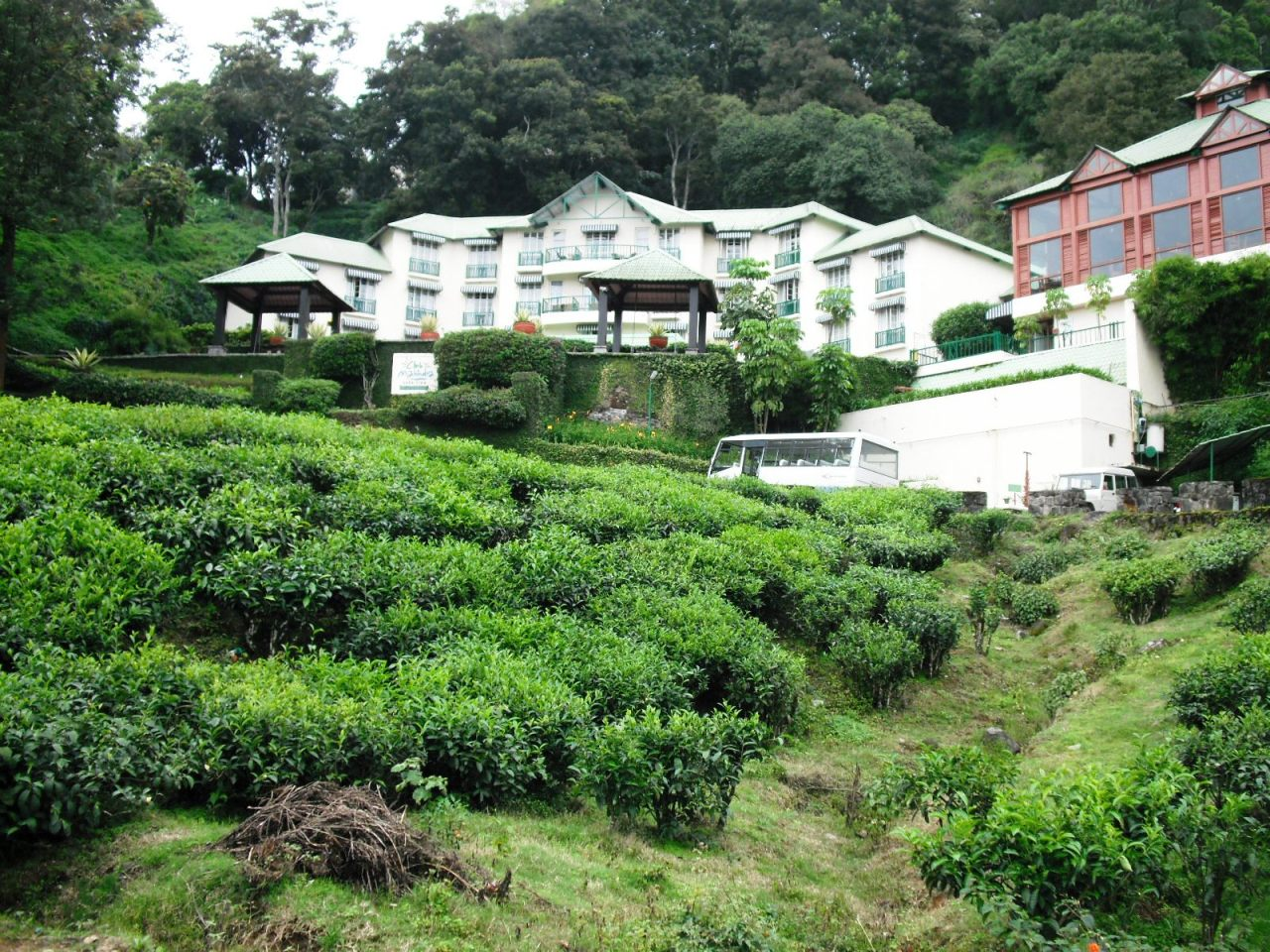
Club Mahindra resort in Munnar

As of 2025, Club Mahindra operates over 140 resorts globally. In India, it has more than 80 resorts in diverse landscapes such as the Himalayas, beaches, hill stations, backwaters, deserts, and forests.

== Acquisitions ==
In 2014, MHRIL acquired an 18.8% stake in European company Holiday Club Resorts Oy. In June 2014, MHRIL acquired Finland-based Holiday Club Resorts for ₹600 crore. In 2015, MHRIL raised its stake in Holiday Club Resorts Oy to 88%.

In 2016, it acquired a 12% stake in Nreach Online Services.

In 2017, the company increased its stake in Holiday Club Resorts Oy by 6.33%, bringing its total holding to 91.94%. In 2017, MHRIL partnered with the Ideal Group of Companies to expand operations in Sri Lanka.

In 2018, Suha Travel & Tours W.L.L became the official distribution partner in Bahrain.
