= SML Mahindra =

Indian vehicle manufacturer

SML Mahindra Limited
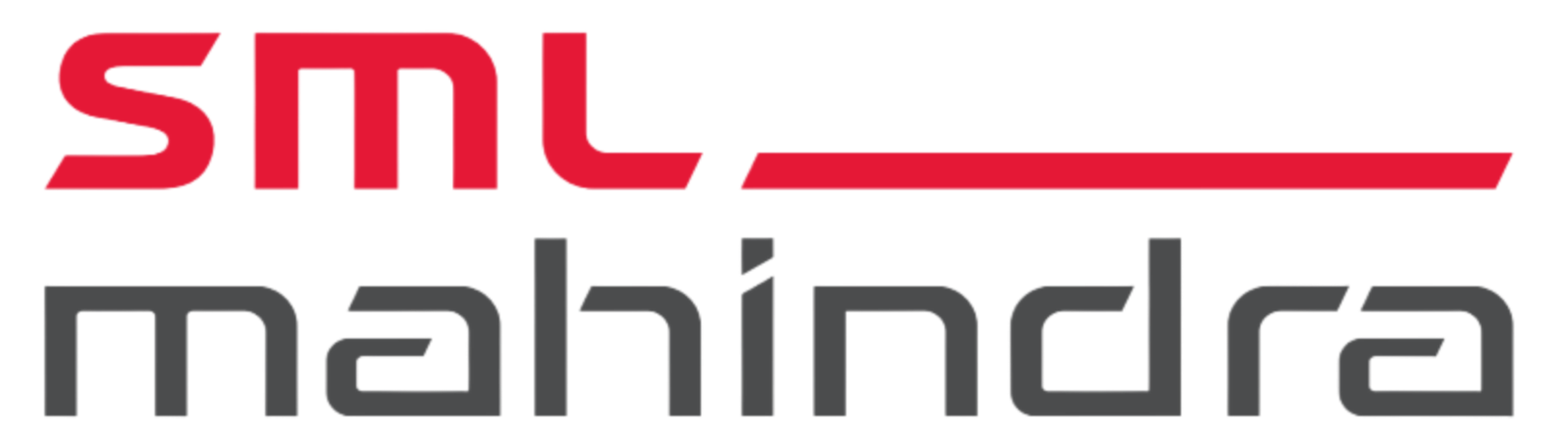
- Formerly: Swaraj Vehicles Limited; Swaraj Mazda Limited; SML Isuzu Limited
- Traded as: NSE: SMLMAH; BSE: 505192
- Founded: 1983; 43 years ago
- Headquarters: India
- Key people: Vinod Kumar Sahay (Executive Chairman)
- Products: Trucks, buses, ambulances, police vehicles, water tankers and other special vehicles
- Parent: Mahindra Automotive (58.96%)
- Website: smlmahindra.com

SML Mahindra Limited (formerly SML Isuzu Limited) is a commercial vehicle manufacturer established in 1983. The company produces and sells buses, ambulances and customized vehicles. Since 2025, it has been controlled by Mahindra & Mahindra.

== Overview ==
The company manufactures light commercial vehicles like trucks, buses, school buses, ambulances, police personnel carriers, water tankers and special vehicles. It exports its products to countries like Nepal, Zambia, Bangladesh, Kenya, Tanzania, Ghana, Ivory Coast, Rwanda, Seychelles, Syria, Jordan.

In April 2025, Mahindra & Mahindra announced plans to acquire a 59% stake in SML Isuzu, acquiring the stakes held by Sumitomo Corporation and Isuzu for Rs 555 crore. That transaction was completed four months later.

== History ==
Swaraj Mazda logo

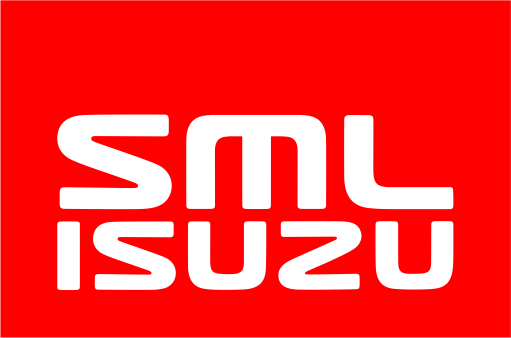
SML Isuzu logo

The company was incorporated in July 1983 with the name of Swaraj Vehicles Limited. Swaraj Mazda Limited, at Chandigarh, India based automobile company, was owned by the Sumitomo Corporation of Japan and Punjab Tractors Limited of India, with a technical collaboration with Isuzu and Mazda of Japan.

=== 1984 ===
Joint venture and technical assistance agreement concluded between Punjab Tractor Ltd., Mazda and Sumitomo Corporation. SVL renamed Swaraj Mazda Ltd.

=== 1985 ===
Project set up with a capacity of 5000 light commercial vehicles (LCVs) at capital outlay of Rs. 200 million. Equity of Rs. 105 million was subscribed by:

| Company | Percentage in Equity | Rs. in Crores |
|---|---|---|
| Punjab Tractors Ltd. | 29.0% | 3.04 |
| Mazda Motor Corp. Japan | 15.6% | 1.64 |
| Sumitomo Corp. Japan | 10.4% | 1.09 |
| Public | 45.0% | 4.73 |

Trial production and test marketing of Swaraj Mazda truck WT-48, WT-49, WT-50 LCV commence. The development of the vendor base undertaken as per approved by the government of India.

=== 1986 ===
After some trial production in 1985, series production began in 1986.

=== 1987 ===
Introduction of indigenously developed bus.

=== 1989 ===
In-house tooling for local production of chassis long member.

=== 1990 ===
In-house developed Second Truck Model (Swaraj Mazda Super) launched.

=== 1991 ===
Transmission components indigenized.

=== 1992 ===
Commencement of Truck supplies to MOD. 500 vehicles supplied to Defense.

=== 1993 ===
Third Truck Model (Swaraj Mazda Premium) launched.

=== 1994 ===
Declared a Sick Company under SICA (due to Rupee devaluation of 1991–93).

=== 1995 ===
BIFR approves Rehabilitation Scheme.

=== 1996 ===
4-Wheel Drive Truck developed.

=== 1997 ===
Company ceases to be a Sick Industrial Company on the basis of positive net worth 4 years ahead of BIFR Scheme projections.

The company's annual turnover for the year 1997 - 1998 exceeded Rs. 151 crores. It has a dealer network of about 128 dealers spread throughout India. Swaraj Engines and Punjab Scooters are its associate companies.

=== 1998 ===
Completely wiped off of accumulated losses.

=== 1999 ===
Bharat Stage-I Emission Norms complied.

=== 2000 ===
Maiden Dividend declared at 10%. Technical Assistance Agreement with Mazda extended up to October 2004.

=== 2001 ===
Cumulative sales crossed 50,000 vehicles. 4 Wheel Drive Ambulance launched in March. Economy Truck 'SARTAJ' launched in August. CNG Bus for NCR Delhi launched in October. Bharat Stage-II Emission Norms complied.

=== 2002 ===
Profit Before Tax for FY 2002 crosses Rs. 100 million mark. Dividend raised to 25%.

=== 2003 ===
Profit Before Tax for FY-2003 grows 115% to Rs. 225 million. Dividend enhanced to 45%.

=== 2004 ===
Profit Before Tax for FY-2004 grows 44% to Rs. 324 million. Dividend enhanced to 70%.

=== 2005 ===
Cumulative sales crossed 86,000 vehicles. Bharat Stage-III emission norms complied (both diesel & CNG). Dividend enhanced to 75%. Punjab Tractors offloads 15% of equity stake in favor of Sumitomo Corporation, Japan in June. Mazda Motor Corporation offloads 15% of equity holding in favor of Sumitomo Corporation, Japan in August.

=== 2006 ===
Permission from Government for new manufacturing facilities at existing site obtained in January. Dividend rate lowered to 55% due profit and declined the Technical Assistance Agreement with Isuzu Motors signed in June. Aggregate vehicles sale crosses 100,000 in August. Construction of Buildings for vehicle expansion and new Bus Body Plant taken up in August.

In June 2006, Swaraj Mazda entered a new technical agreement with Isuzu Motors, Japan.

=== 2007 ===
Dividend rate maintained at 55%. Trial Production of Isuzu Bus LT134 taken up in July.

=== 2008 ===
Dividend rate maintained at 55%. Highest-ever profit in the history of the company. Launch of Ultra Luxury Buses in July.

=== 2009 ===
Sumitomo upped its stake in the company in 2009 by purchasing all of Punjab Tractors' remaining shares, raising their stake to 53.5%

In 2009, Swaraj Mazda started to roll out Luxury buses and medium-duty trucks powered by Isuzu Engines from a new plant in Punjab. Plans are to build multi-axle trucks, tractor units and refrigerated trucks within the next three years. For an interim period, these vehicles were marketed under the Swaraj Mazda Isuzu brand.

In addition, Swaraj Mazda is moving to offer the Isuzu D-Max pickup.

Former associate company Punjab Tractors manufactured agricultural tractors and combine harvesters under the Swaraj brand name before selling 64.6% to Mahindra Tractors. In 2009, Mahindra and Swaraj Mazda settled a dispute over the use of the Swaraj name, allowing Swaraj Mazda to continue using the name for only two more years.

=== 2010 ===
During the financial year 2009–10 the company had issued 3,984,946 equity share of Rs. 10 each at a premium of Rs. 190 per share on rights basis to the Equity shareholders of the company in the ratio of 11 equity shares for every 50 Equity shares held on the record date and raised Rs. 796989,000 for financing of Expansion project, repayment of loan taken from Allahabad Bank (for Expansion Project) and for general corporate purposes.

Swaraj Mazda Limited has informed the Exchange that at the Board Meeting of the Company held on 1 October 2010, the Board of Directors have decided to change the name of the company from Swaraj Mazda Limited to SML Isuzu Limited. As of 2011 they no longer use the "Swaraj" brand name.

=== 2011 ===
Swaraj Mazda renamed as SML ISUZU LIMITED.

=== 2012 ===
SML S7 Bus, Wheelbase −5100 mm, 50+1 Seater Launched.

BS-IV Compliant Engine Successfully Tested. (But Buses is not success)

ISUZU FR1318 Luxury Bus, Wheelbase – 5400 mm Launched.

SML HG72 Truck GVW 7200 kg Truck Launched.

SML HD19 Truck GVW 10250 kg Truck Launched.

=== 2025 ===
SML Isuzu acquired by Mahindra with the Stake 58.86% and renamed as SML Mahindra.

== Vehicles ==
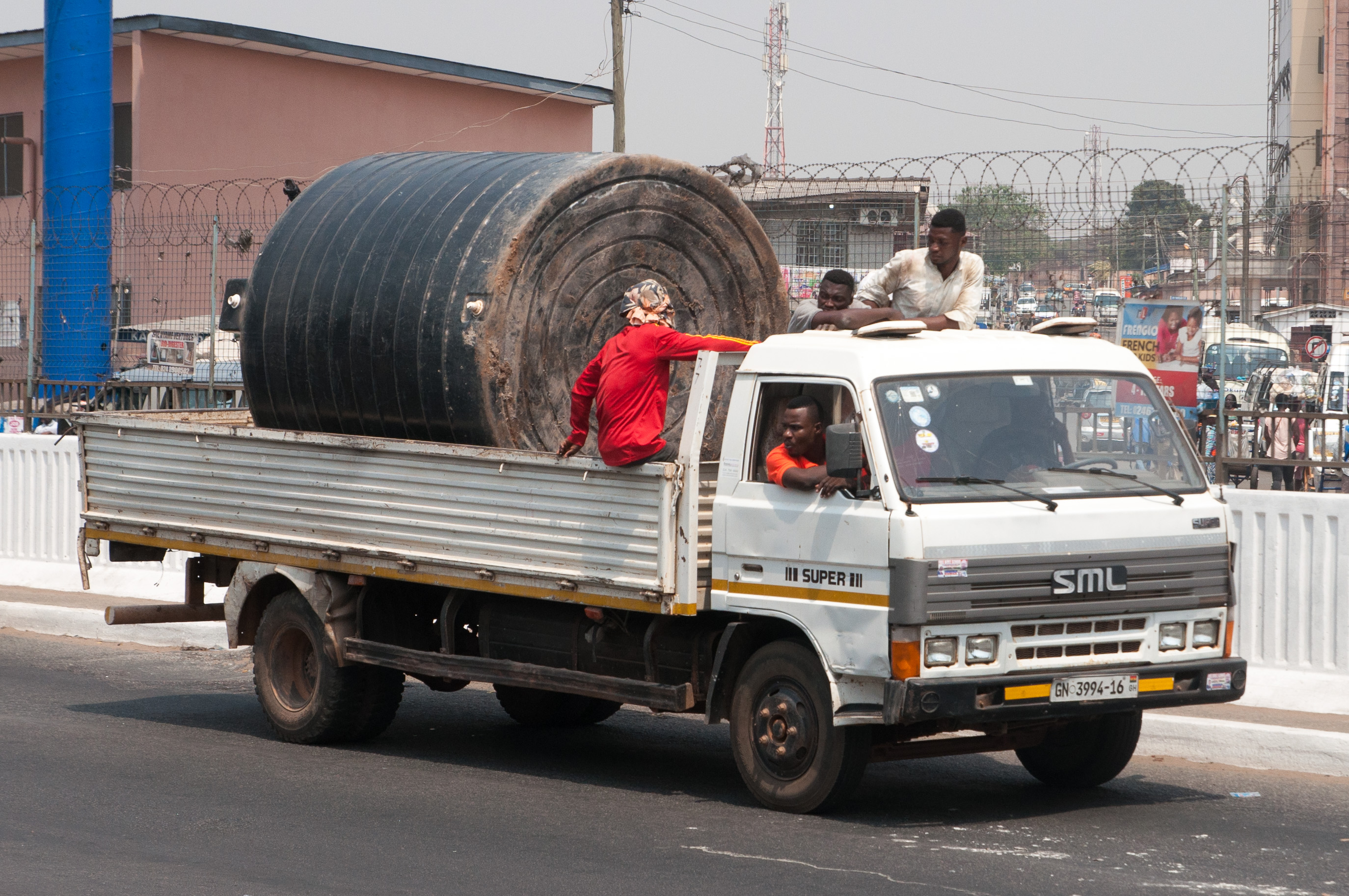
SML rigid truck with water tank loaded.

=== Trucks ===
SML

1. Sartaj 5252 Rigid
2. Super GS Rigid
3. Sartaj GS 59 Rigid
4. Sartaj HG72 Rigid
5. Samrat GS Rigid
6. Samrat GS XT Rigid
7. Supreme GS Rigid
8. Super Tipper
9. Prestige Tipper
10. Samrat GS Tipper

==== Buses ====
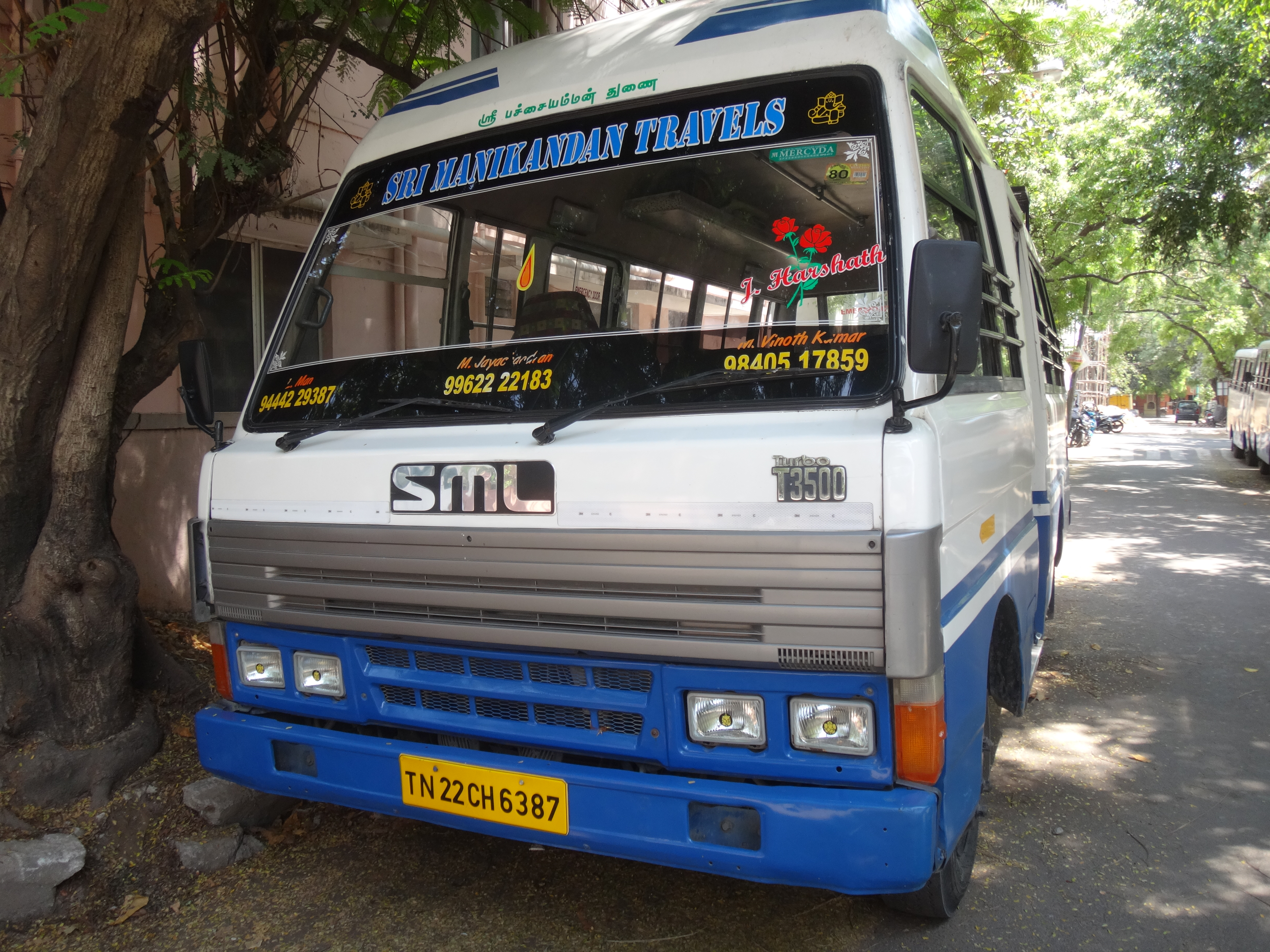
SML T3500 bus in Tamil Nadu

SML

1. S7
2. Hiroi
3. Hiroi EV
4. Ecomax
5. Ecomax LR
6. Executive
7. Executive LX
8. Aasai MX
9. BH Series

Isuzu

1. NQR
2. FR1318
3. LT134
4. IS12TE Chassis
5. NQR Bus Chassis
6. LT134 Bus Chassis
