= Mahindra Ugine Steel =

- Company type: Public
- Traded as: BSE: 504823; NSE: MAHINDUGIN
- Industry: Steel
- Founded: 1962, Mumbai
- Headquarters: Mumbai, Maharashtra, India
- Key people: Hitesh Patel (Chairman); Somesh Jojare, Vice Chairman
- Revenue: ₹1,342.91 crore (US$140 million) (2011)
- Parent: Mahindra Group
- Website: Official Website

Mahindra Sanyo Special Steel Private Limited or formerly known as Mahindra Ugine Steel (MUSCO) is a manufacturer of specialty steel, stampings, and rings headquartered in Mumbai, India. It is a joint venture of the Mahindra Group, one of India's largest industrial houses and Sanyo Special Steel Co. Ltd and Mitsui & Co. Ltd from Japan

MUSCO has three stampings facilities located near key automotive clusters in India: Kanhe to serve the manufacturing cluster in Pune; Nashik; and Rudrapur to serve Northern India. Together, MUSCO has a total stampings capacity of 30,000 metric tons per year. Its ring rolling division also has a total capacity of 30,000 metric tons. It was the first steel company in India to receive an ISO 9001:2000 Certificate in 2002 and in 2005, it received ISO TS 16949 certification.

== History ==
MUSCO was incorporated on 19 December 1962 in Mumbai. It began as a dealership/seller of tool, alloy, and specialty steels. In 1964, MUSCO was first listed on Mumbai Stock Exchange.

== Awards ==
- Caterpillar for supply of high quality steel bars.
