= COVID-19 pandemic in Jharkhand =

Ongoing COVID-19 viral pandemic in Jharkhand, India

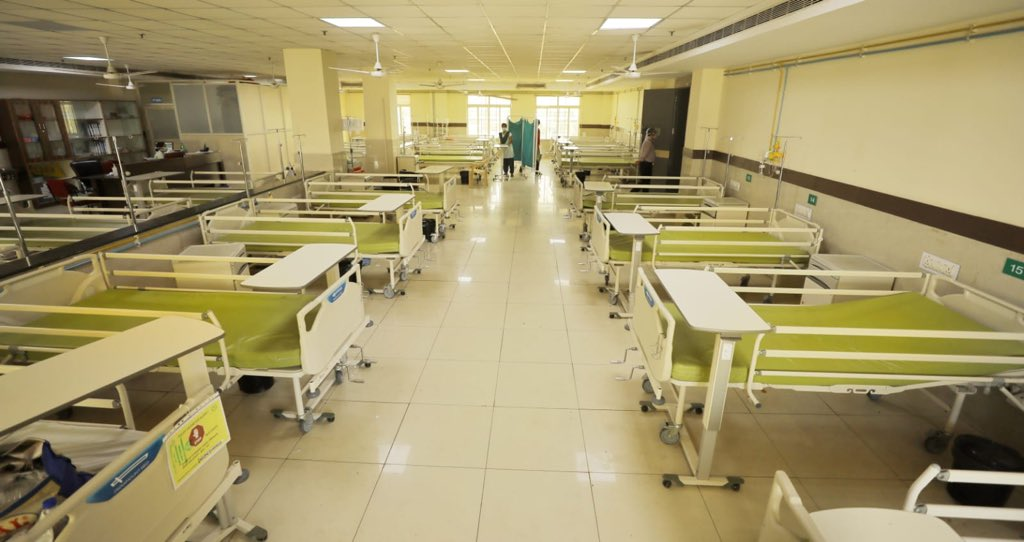
- Disease: COVID-19
- Pathogen: SARS-CoV-2
- Location: Jharkhand, India
- Index case: Ranchi
- Arrival date: 31 March 2020 (6 years, 4 months, 3 weeks and 3 days)
- Confirmed cases: 1,11,366 (as of 12 December)
- Active cases: 1610 (as of 12 December)
- Recovered: 1,08,761 (as of 12 December)
- Deaths: 995 (as of 12 December)
- Fatality rate: 0.9%
- Territories: 24 out of 24

The first case of the COVID-19 pandemic was confirmed in the Indian state of Jharkhand on 31 March 2020 after a Malaysian women tested positive. The state has confirmed a total of 1,11,366 cases, including 995 deaths and 1,08,761 recoveries, as of 12 December.

== Testing and treatment measures ==
Chaibasa district headquarters of West Singhbhum launched coronavirus swab collection booth which is India's first of the kind. Chaibasa also launched remote-controlled robot called co-bot for providing medicines and food and minimize the contact between the staff and the patients. After MGM Medical College in Jamshedpur and RIMS in Ranchi, ICMR gave approval for 2 more testing facilities in the state namely, Patliputra Medical College in Dhanbad and TB Sanitorium Hospital in Itki, Ranchi. So, the total testing facility in the state stands at 4.

== Timeline ==
=== Charts ===
The numbers are from data published by Ministry of Health and Family Welfare on their website.
Source: covid19india.org

Graph source: Data from MoHFW
Graph source: Data from covid19india.org

== See also ==
- COVID-19 pandemic in India
