= Punjab Tractors Ltd. =

Tractor manufacturing company in India

Mahindra & Mahindra Ltd- Swaraj Division
- Industry: Agricultural & Farm Equipment Manufacturers
- Founded: 1972
- Founder: Punjab Tractors Limited (India), Punjab State Government and CMERI Government of India
- Successor: Mahindra & Mahindra
- Products: Agricultural Tractors; Combine Harvesters; Forklift Trucks
- Number of employees: 2100

Punjab Tractors was the first Indian company to manufacture agricultural tractors indigenously. The brand was named Swaraj, a term associated with self-reliance, a concept promoted by Mahatma Gandhi. The company originated from a design project initiated in the 1960s at the Central Mechanical Engineering Research Institute (CMERI), Durgapur (West Bengal), and later developed into an organization based in Mohali, Punjab.

Swaraj division is a tractor and farm equipment making company which is owned by Mahindra & Mahindra Ltd. Formerly known as Punjab Tractors Limited, the company was taken over by Mahindra Group in 2007 and subsequently in 2009, the name was changed to swaraj division.

== History ==
It was in 1964 that the then Prime Minister of India, Pt. Jawaharlal Nehru invited Man Mohan Suri to join as Director of CMERI. In April 1965, on Suri's invitation, Chandra Mohan quit Indian Railways and joined CMERI. In August 1965, Man Mohan Suri accompanied Prime Minister Lal Bahadur Shastri’s delegation to Moscow as a technical expert and returned with the idea of manufacturing 20HP tractors for small farmers at a rate of around 12000 tractors per annum. In September 1965, a five-page proposal was submitted to Union Planning Commission (Subsequently changed to Niti Aayog) and the project was assigned.

== Basic R&D and development of prototypes ==
The basic R&D began at CMERI in 1965. The core design team was around six young engineers, mostly fresh engineering graduates with limited knowledge of materials and processing. No one except Mr. Chandra Mohan was familiar with agricultural tractors.

In order to gain some insight, two tractors were bought for detailed study. Technical Inputs regarding product design were obtained from various sources, viz. Indian Patent Office, Kolkata and IIT Kharagpur (The only institute running PG course in Agricultural Engineering at that time).

The inputs regarding product specifications were obtained from sources such as Punjab Agricultural University, Ludhiana; G. B. Pant University of Agriculture and Technology, and individual Farmers.

The basic product specifications worked out on the basis of inputs gathered from various sources included features such as automatic implement-control system, failure-proof working even in the hottest of summers, low-cost serviceability, and a concept of "Unified Series".

Realizing the importance of modular design right from the conceptualization phase, the design range was conceived as a unified series right from the beginning, by virtue of which, many major sub-assemblies as well as tooling were designed to be common across different tractor models. During the subsequent manufacturing stage, these concepts proved significantly valuable in bringing down the manufacturing costs and lead-times, while enhancing product reliability by relying on well-established modules and methods. The first prototype testing in 1967 proved to be a failure, but the team continued to improve their design, thereby gaining vital experience in the process.

== Launch of Punjab Tractors Limited (PTL) ==
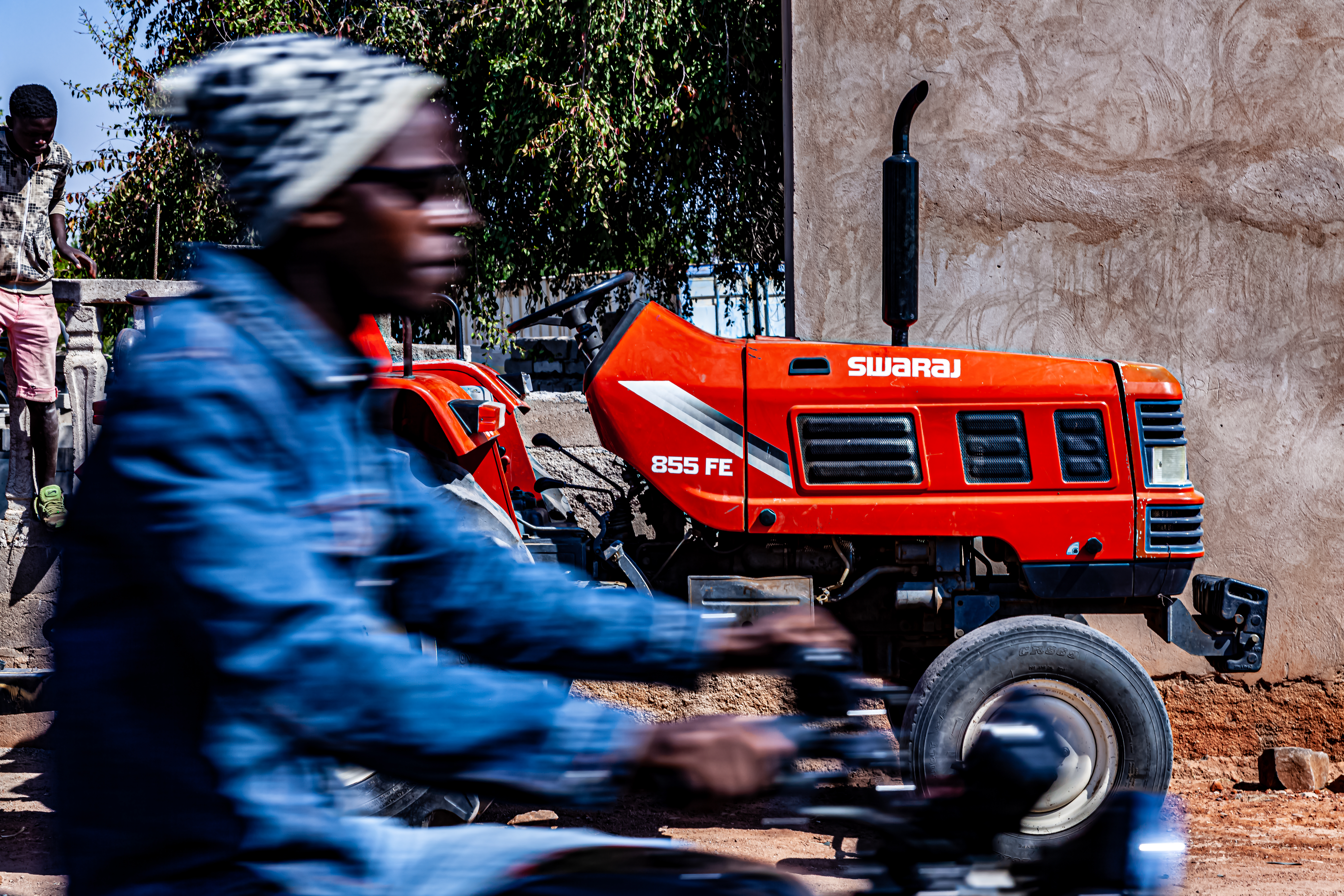
Swaraj 855 in Angola (2019)

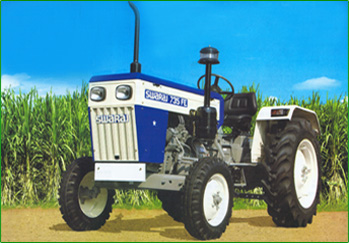
Swaraj 735

Punjab State Industrial Development Corporation (PSIDC) came forward for providing partial support for funds on the condition that the members of core design team resign from CMERI and come to Punjab for implementation, following which the work began in May 1970. Given unproven credentials, the team faced many challenges in procuring funds and approvals for the project. Owing to lack of manufacturing facilities, the manufacturing license had to be obtained on the basis of a temporary certification from National Certification Centre for Tractors, Budni (MP).

== Milestones ==
- 1972: Opening of the public issue
- 1972: Construction at Mohali
- 1974: Commencement of commercial production of Swaraj 724
- 1974: FICCI Award
- 1975: Unified design facilitates the company to launch Swaraj 735 within a few months. For many years, Swaraj 735 remained the single largest selling model in India.
- 1975: Awarded the National Gold Shield for import substitution.
- 1976: ASSOCHAM Award for ancillary promotion.
- 1977: Expansion of Mohali plant
- 1978: IMM Toshiba Gold Award for Marketing
- 1979: Introduction of Swaraj 720.
- 1980: Acquired Punjab Scooters Ltd. (Subsequently, transformed into Swaraj Automotives Ltd., Nabha)
- 1980: Expansion of Mohali plant.
- 1981: Setting-up of Swaraj Combine Division.
- 1981: Setting-up of Swaraj Foundry Division.
- 1982: Swaraj Harvester Combine rolls out.
- 1983: Introduction of Swaraj 855: PTL's HP-range became broader than that of all competitors combined.
- 1984: Incorporation of Swaraj Mazda Limited.
- 1985: LCV's roll-out from Swaraj Mazda Ltd.
- 1985: Padma Shri Award to Mr. Chandra Mohan
- 1986: Incorporation of Swaraj Engines Ltd (SEL). SEL became another Blue Chip company within 10 years.
- 1986: Introduction of Swaraj Forklifts.
- 1987: Implementation of Dr. Juran's concepts for management: 22 teams constituted.
- 1990: QIMPRO Gold for TQM.
- 1993: Mohali expansion to 24000 tractors per annum.
- 1994: Tractor Plant in Swaraj Combine Division, Chapar Chiri, having a capacity of 12000 tractors per annum.
- 1996: Expansion of Mohali plant to produce 30000 tractors per annum.
- 1997: Expansion of Chapar Chiri plant to produce 30000 tractors per annum.
- 1998: Introduction of Swaraj 922, Swaraj 722 and New Swaraj 855.
- 1999: Introduction of Swaraj 744.
- 2002: Cumulative sales cross 500,000 mark.
- 2007: Mahindra & Mahindra acquires majority stake in Punjab Tractors Ltd.
- 2009: Merger of PTL into M&M and subsequent transformation as the Swaraj Division of Mahindra & Mahindra Ltd.
- 2011: Rated Highest In Industry for Customer Satisfaction Index (CSI), Sales Satisfaction Index (SSI) & CaPS
- 2012: Swaraj becomes the second tractor company in the world to win the prestigious DEMING Prize
- 2012: Rated Highest In Industry for Customer Satisfaction Index (CSI)
- 2013: Swaraj Division Plant 1 and Plant 2 Won TPM Excellence Award From JIPM

== Take-over by Mahindra & Mahindra Ltd. ==
Following disinvestment by the state government, Punjab Tractors Limited was eventually taken-over by Mahindra & Mahindra in 2007. This acquisition made Mahindra & Mahindra World's largest tractor manufacturer. Subsequent to this take-over, the former PTL was merged into M&M and transformed as Swaraj division of Mahindra & Mahindra in the year 2009. As of 2016, the division has over 2100 employees, a network of over 1500 sales/service centres and 600 dealerships across India, while the product portfolio comprises tractor models ranging from below 30HP to over 50HP power.
