= Anish Shah (businessman) =

Indian businessman (born 1969)

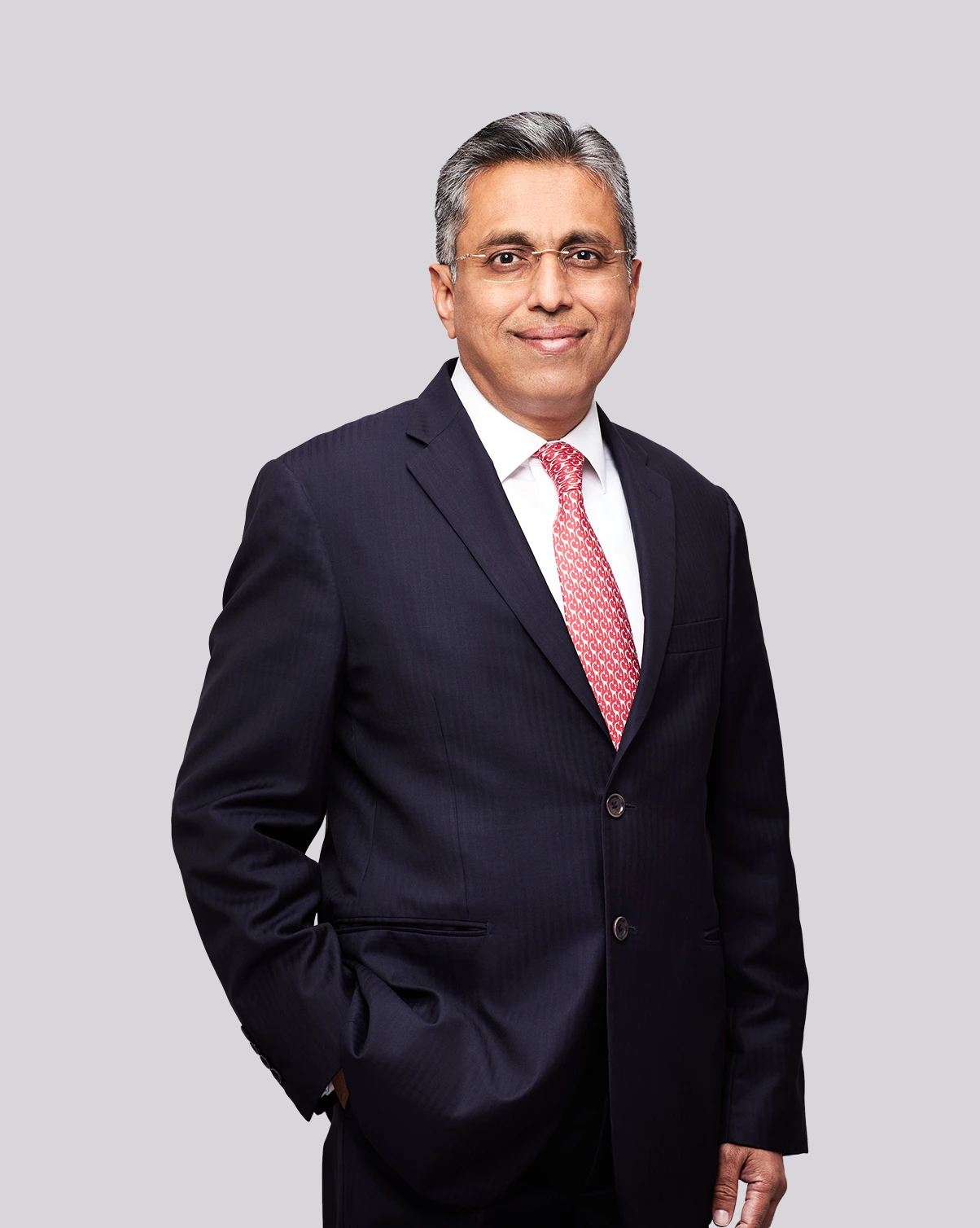
- Born: 26 December 1969 (age 56); Mumbai, Maharashtra, India
- Education: Mumbai University (B.Com); Indian Institute of Management Ahmedabad (PGDM); Carnegie Mellon University (PhD)
- Occupation: Businessman
- Known for: Managing Director of Mahindra Group

Anish Shah (born 26 December 1969) is an Indian businessman and the chief executive officer and managing director of Mahindra Group.

Prior to working at the Mahindra Group, Shah led GE Capital India. He also worked for Bank of America's Debit Products business in the US, Bain & Company in Boston, and Citibank in Mumbai. Shah also served as the president of the Federation of Indian Chambers of Commerce & Industry for the 2023-2024 term.

== Early life and education ==
Shah was born on 26 December 1969 and raised in Mumbai, Maharashtra, India to the pharmaceutical executive Dilip G Shah, founder of Indian Pharmaceutical Alliance. He completed his early schooling from Jamnabai Narsee School, and graduated from Sydenham College of Commerce and Economics.

He completed his post-graduate diploma in management from the Indian Institute of Management Ahmedabad. Shah completed his PhD in finance and accounting from Carnegie Mellon University.

== Career ==
Shah began his career in Mumbai with Citibank India, and later worked as a strategy consultant at Bain & Company in Boston. According to the company’s leadership profile, he also led Bank of America's Debit Products business. In 2009, he joined GE Capital India as President & CEO after spending about 14 years with GE Capital’s US and global units. In 2014 he was appointed to head Group special projects for the Mahindra Group. In 2019, he took on the role of Deputy Managing Director and Group Chief Financial Officer (CFO). He served as Deputy Managing Director and Group Chief Financial Officer (CFO) during a transitional period which commenced in April 2020 before being appointed managing director and CEO of the Mahindra Group in April 2021.

Shah is also a member of the Government of India's Board of Trade, under the chairmanship of the Minister of Commerce and Industry. In December 2023, Shah became president of the Federation of Indian Chambers of Commerce & Industry (FICCI), a non-governmental trade association and advocacy group. Shah is also co-chair of both the India-Australia CEO Forum and the India Alliance of CEOs for Climate Change.

Additionally, he is a member of the World Economic Forum's International Business Council and the NITI Frontier Tech Hub Expert Council for AI.He also served as chair of the World Economic Forum's Automotive Governors Council from 2022 to 2024 and served as a member of the UK Investment Council from 2021 to 2024.

=== As CEO of Mahindra ===
Shah became Managing Director and Chief Executive Officer of the Mahindra Group in April 2021. During Shah’s tenure, Mahindra restructured its portfolio by exiting underperforming international operations, including SsangYong and GenZe.

The company increased investment in its core automotive and farm equipment segments and announced a stronger emphasis on electric mobility. In February 2025, Mahindra launched its electric SUV models the XEV 9e and BE 6, which, according to multiple reports, received around 30,179 bookings on the first day of order opening.

The group later established a separate electric-vehicle subsidiary, Mahindra Electric Automobile Ltd (MEAL), which attracted investment from Temasek at an estimated valuation of US$9.8 billion.

Shah has stated publicly that electrification is one of Mahindra’s strategic priorities for future growth.

== Recognition ==
- In 2023, Shah was listed among the "Best CEOs in India" in Fortune India magazine’s annual Best CEOs special issue.
- In 2024, he was named the “Entrepreneurial CEO” at the EY Entrepreneur of the Year Awards, which recognise business leaders for innovation and growth in India.
- Shah was named CEO of the Year at the Forbes India Leadership Awards 2026 and the Manufacturing & Retail Excellence award at Business Today’s India’s Best CEOs.
- In 2026, Shah was named Business Leader of the Year at the NDTV Profit Business Leadership Awards.
