= Mahindra Group =

Indian multinational conglomerate

- Type: Private
- Industry: Conglomerate
- Founded: 2 October 1945; 81 years ago
- Founder: Jagdish Chandra Mahindra; Kailash Chandra Mahindra
- Headquarters: Mumbai, Maharashtra, India
- Area served: Worldwide
- Key people: Anand Mahindra (Chairman); Keshub Mahindra (Chairman Emeritus); Anish Shah (MD & CEO)
- Products: Automotive; IT services; Finance; Hospitality; Agribusiness; Defense; Aerospace; Logistics; Real estate; Education
- Revenue: ▲US$30 billion (FY 2026)
- Owner: Anand Mahindra
- Number of employees: 327,000+ (2026)
- Website: www.mahindra.com

Mahindra Group is an Indian multinational conglomerate, headquartered in Mumbai. The group has operations in over 100 countries, with a presence in aerospace, agribusiness, automotive, construction equipment, defence, energy, farm equipment, finance and insurance, industrial equipment, information technology, leisure and hospitality, logistics, real estate, retail and education. The group's flagship company Mahindra & Mahindra has market leadership in utility vehicles as well as tractors in India.

== History ==
Mahindra & Mahindra was incorporated as Mahindra & Mohammed in 1945 by the brothers J. C. Mahindra and K. C. Mahindra, and Malik Ghulam Muhammad in Ludhiana, Punjab to trade steel. Following the Partition of India in 1947, Malik Ghulam Muhammad left the company and emigrated to Pakistan, where he became the first finance minister of the new state (and later the third Governor General in 1951). In 1948, K. C. Mahindra changed the company's name to Mahindra & Mahindra.

Building on their expertise in the steel industry, the Mahindra brothers began trading steel with UK suppliers. They won a contract to manufacture Willys Jeeps in India and began producing them in 1947. By 1956, the company was listed on the Bombay Stock Exchange, and by 1969 the company became an exporter of utility vehicles and spare parts. Like many Indian companies, Mahindra responded to the restrictions of the Licence Raj by expanding into other industries. Mahindra & Mahindra created a tractor division in 1982 and a tech division (now Tech Mahindra) in 1986. It has continued to diversify its operations through both joint ventures and greenfield investments.

By 1994, the group had become so diverse that it undertook a fundamental reorganization, dividing into six Strategic Business Units: Automotive; Farm Equipment; Infrastructure; Trade and Financial services; Information Technology; and Automotive Components (known internally as Systech). The new managing director, Anand Mahindra, followed this reorganization with a new logo in 2000 and the successful launch of the Mahindra Scorpio (a wholly indigenously designed vehicle) in 2002. Along with an overhaul in production and manufacturing methods, these changes helped make the company more competitive, and since then the Group's reputation and revenues have risen noticeably. Currently, Mahindra & Mahindra is one of the 20 largest companies in India In 2009, Forbes ranked Mahindra among the top 200 most reputable companies in the world.

In January 2011, the Mahindra Group launched a new corporate brand, Mahindra Rise, to unify Mahindra's image across industries and geographies. The brand positions Mahindra products and services as aspirational, supporting customers' ambitions to 'Rise.'

In April 2012, the Mahindra Group expressed interest in purchasing the bankrupt automobile company Saab, and placed several bids for Saab, though was outbid by Saab's new owner National Electric Vehicle Sweden.

On 29 July 2026, the Mahindra & Mahindra incorporated Novavayu Aerospace Limited (NAL) as a step-down and wholly owned subsidiary of Mahindra Defence Systems Limited. The subsidiary was meant to manufacture aircraft and aerospace product to cater to the defence sector. The company would be headquartered in Mumbai with a share capital of ₹1 crore (US$110,000). On 9 October, Embraer signed an Investment Agreement with M&M to acquired 51% of stakes in NAL at a cost of ₹5.1 lakh (US$5,400). Upon completion of the transaction, which is expected by 1 December, NAL will become an associate of MDSL instead of a wholly owned subsidiary. The firm is yet to generate any revenue.

== Affiliated companies ==
| Company | Major subsidiaries |
Aerospace and defence
| Mahindra Advanced Technologies Limited | Mahindra Defence Systems Limited |
| Mahindra Defence Systems Limited | Novavayu Aerospace Limited |
| Mahindra Aerospace | |
Automotive
| Mahindra & Mahindra | Mahindra Advanced Technologies Limited |
| Mahindra Accelo | |
| Mahindra First Choice | |
Agriculture
| Mahindra Agribusiness | EPC Mahindra |
Consulting
| Mahindra Integrated Business Solutions | |
| Mahindra Logisoft | |
| Mahindra Special Services Group | |
Energy
| Mahindra Solarize | |
| Mahindra teqo | |
| Mahindra Susten | |
Hospitality
| Mahindra Holidays and Resorts | |
Information technology
| Tech Mahindra | |
Financial Services
| Mahindra & Mahindra Financial Services Limited | |
Education
| Mahindra United World College of India | |
| Mahindra University | |
Real estate
| Mahindra Lifespaces | |
| Mahindra World City | |
Logistics
| Mahindra Logistics | |
Retail and e-commerce
| M2ALL | |
Sports
| Mahindra Racing | |

== Community initiatives ==
The Mahindra Group is extensively involved in philanthropy and volunteering. It is considered an active participant in the Indian Corporate Social Responsibility field and received the Pegasus Award for CSR in 2007. Mahindra engages in philanthropy primarily through the KC Mahindra Trust, which serves as the CSR arm of the group (although many subsidiaries have their own CSR initiatives, notably Tech Mahindra and Mahindra Satyam). Founded in 1953 by K.C Mahindra, the trust focuses primarily on fostering literacy in India and promoting higher learning through grants and scholarships. Mahindra operates several vocational schools as well as the Mahindra United World College. The KC Mahindra Trust's primary project however is Project Nanhi Kali, which targets the education of young Indian girls. The foundation currently supports the education of approximately 153,190 underprivileged girls. Other initiatives include Mahindra Hariyali (a 1 million tree planting campaign) as well as sponsorship of the Lifeline Express, a mobile hospital train. Mahindra employees also plan and lead their own service projects through Mahindra's Employee Social Options Plans. In 2009, more than 35,000 employees participated.

The Mahindra Group was responsible for the creation of Mahindra United World College, a UWC campus located in Pune.

Mahindra supports the Mahindra Excellence in Theatre Awards to recognize Indian theater talent, the Mahindra Indo-American Film Festival, and the Mahindra Lucknow Festival. In 2011, it held the first annual Mahindra Blues Festival with guests including Buddy Guy, Johnny Lang, and Shemekia Copeland at the Mehboob Studios in Mumbai. Mahindra partners with the NBA and Celtic Football Club to bring grassroots basketball and football to India.

== Leadership ==
Keshub Mahindra was the Chairman Emeritus of Mahindra & Mahindra and a graduate of Wharton Business School, University of Pennsylvania, USA. He joined the company in 1947 and became the chairman in 1963.

During his career he has also been Chairman of Bombay Chamber of Commerce and Industry (1966–67), President of ASSOCHAM (1969–70), Chairman of the Indian Institute of Management Ahmedabad (1975–85); Member of the Foundation Board – International Institute for Management Development (1984–89).

His awards include: Companion – British Institute of Management (1985), Chevalier de la Légion d'honneur (1987), Business India – Businessman of the Year (1989), Honorary Fellowship of All India Management Association (1990), Institute of Company Secretaries of India (ICSI) Lifetime Achievement Award for Excellence in Corporate Governance (2004), Lakshya Business Visionary Award – NITIE (2006), ICFAI Business School (IBS) Kolkata Lifetime Achievement Award presented by the Institute of Chartered Financial Analysts of India (ICFAI) (2007).

At the time of the Bhopal Disaster he was managing director of Union Carbide India Ltd. (In 2010 he was charged and indicted for causing death due to negligence and sentenced to 2 years' imprisonment and Rs 1 Lakh fine.) He was granted bail shortly after being sentenced.

Anand Mahindra is chairman and managing director of Mahindra & Mahindra. He graduated from Harvard University and earned his MBA from Harvard Business School in 1981. He joined the Mahindra Group in 1981 as an Executive Assistant to the Finance Director of the Mahindra Ugine Steel Company.

== See also ==
- Club Mahindra Holidays
- Mahindra & Mahindra
- Tech Mahindra
- Mahindra Aerospace
