= Indian Pharmaceutical Alliance =

The Indian Pharmaceutical Alliance (IPA) is an association of domestic Indian pharmaceutical companies. IPA was founded in August 1999 by Dilip G Shah and six Indian drugmakers: Cipla, Dr. Reddy's, Lupin, Piramal, Ranbaxy, and Wockhardt. IPA was founded to promote the cause of generic drugs in India and has since expanded to include 24 domestic pharmaceutical companies. Sudarshan Jain is the current secretary general of the IPA.

== History ==
The IPA was founded in opposition to the intellectual property rights for drugs defined by the TRIPS agreement. Divya Rajgopal, writing for The Economic Times, notes that:

Shah and the IPA became the body that resisted the Intellectual Property Rights that lower income countries like India were forced to sign under the World Trade Organisation's TRIPS agreement. The IPA positioned itself as the voice of generic drug companies that claimed to represent the interests of Indian drug companies who were bullied under these TRIPS agreement.

Recently, the IPA has clashed with the Indian pricing drug regulator, National Pharmaceutical Pricing Authority, over regulating the prices of medicines in India and has worked with drug regulators in the United States about reducing quality issues in Indian pharmaceutical companies.
