= Anish Shah (comedian) =

American stand-up comedian (born 1978)

- Born: January 30, 1978 (age 48); Chicago, Illinois, USA
- Education: University of Illinois Urbana-Champaign, Yale School of Management
- Occupation: Comedian
- Website: www.anishcomedy.com

Anish Shah (born January 30, 1978) is an American stand-up comedian most known for his work with the "Kill a Mother" foundation.

== Career ==
After getting an MBA from Yale Shah spent five years as a consultant for McKinsey & Company. He switched directions in 2010 and began pursuing a career in stand-up comedy, which he had previously pursued in college.

In 2012, Shah relocated to New York City. Later that year, he produced and headlined the "No Laughing Matter" tour, which raised funds for the Save a Mother Foundation. He has since continued to perform live and on television, including in a television comedy special alongside Kunal Nayyar.

He also launched the "B-School Made Me Funny" tour, a one-hour comedy act that specifically focuses on his experiences in business school and the corporate world. Since launching the "B-School tours," Anish has performed at number of colleges including his alma mater, Yale, Dartmouth and UCLA.

After being named one of the "50 Coolest South Asians," by Desi Club Shah produced and hosted his first show on Broadway, "International Incident" at Carolines in 2012. It is now in its 4th year and has been selected multiple times for the New York Comedy Festival.

In 2016, Anish Shah was one of 6 people chosen from more than 1000 candidates to enter NBC's Late Night Writers Program. That same year he was selected, from over 4000 applicants, to work on the CBS Diversity Showcase.

== Charity ==
In 2012, Shah joined forces with the nonprofit organization Save a Mother to raise money to combat maternal mortality in India by launching a nationwide comedy tour called "No Laughing Matter", featuring fellow Indian comedians and celebrities like Azhar Usman, Melanie Kannokada and Outsourced star Parvesh Cheena.

Shah has performed at America India Foundation Galas around the country that have collectively raised more than $5M. In addition, he has worked with many other charities such as Pratham, Blue Horizon, and TiE.
