= Journal of Generic Medicines =

- Discipline: Management and marketing of generic drugs
- Language: English
- Edited by: Brian Tempest

Publication details
- History: 2003-present
- Publisher: SAGE Publications
- Frequency: Quarterly

Standard abbreviations
- ISO 4: J. Generic Med.

Indexing
- ISSN: 1741-1343 (print); 1741-7090 (web)
- LCCN: 2007206198
- OCLC no.: 1004539399

Links
- Journal homepage; Online access; Online archive

The Journal of Generic Medicines is a quarterly peer-reviewed medical journal covering marketing, patent law, and regulatory issues relevant for generic drugs. The editor-in-chief is Brian Tempest (Hale & Tempest Co). It was established in 2001 and is published by SAGE Publications.

== Abstracting and indexing ==
The journal is abstracted and indexed in:

- EBSCO databases
- Embase/Excerpta Medica
- ProQuest databases
- Scopus (2003–2015, 2017; discontinued))
