= Anand Mahindra =

Indian businessman (born 1955)

Anand Gopal Mahindra
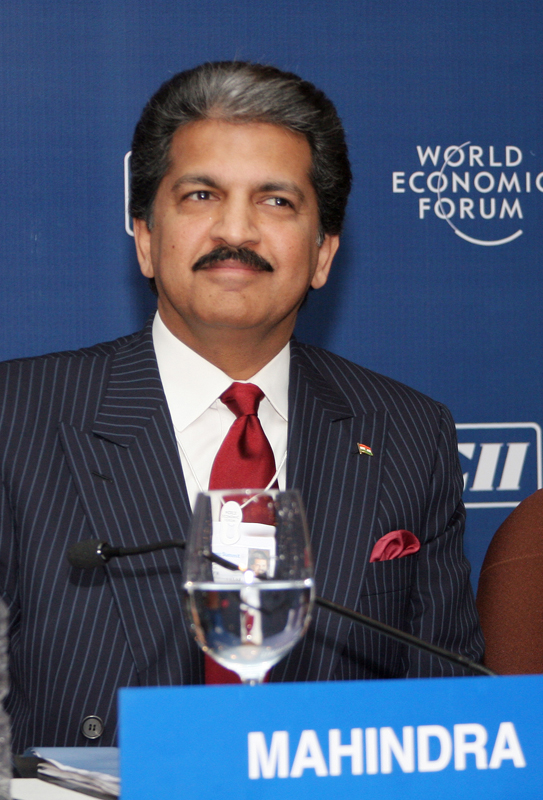
- Born: 1 May 1955 (age 71); Bombay, Bombay State, India
- Education: The Lawrence School, Lovedale; Harvard University (BA, MBA)
- Occupation: Businessman
- Title: Chairman, Mahindra Group
- Spouse: Anuradha Mahindra
- Children: 2 daughters
- Website: www.mahindra.com

Anand Gopal Mahindra (born 1 May 1955) is an Indian billionaire businessman, and the chairman of Mahindra Group, a Mumbai-based business conglomerate. The group operates in aerospace, agribusiness, aftermarket, automotive, components, construction equipment, defence, energy, farm equipment, finance and insurance, industrial equipment, information technology, leisure and hospitality, logistics, real estate and retail. Mahindra is the grandson of Jagdish Chandra Mahindra, co-founder of Mahindra & Mahindra.

As of 2023, his net worth according to Forbes was estimated to be $2.1 billion. He is an alumnus of Harvard University and Harvard Business School. In 1996, he established Nanhi Kali, a non-government organisation that supports education for underprivileged girls in India.

He is included by Fortune Magazine among the 'World's 50 Greatest Leaders', and was in the magazine's 2011 listing of Asia's 25 most powerful businesspeople. Anand was noted by Forbes (India) as their 'Entrepreneur of the Year' for 2013. He was given the Padma Bhushan Award, the third highest civilian award in India, in January 2020.

As per Forbes list of India’s 100 richest tycoons, dated 9 October 2024, Anand Mahindra is ranked 80th with a net worth of $3.97 billion.

== Early life ==
Anand Mahindra was born on 1 May 1955 in Bombay, India to the late industrialist Harish Mahindra and Indira Mahindra. Anand has two sisters; Anuja Sharma and Radhika Nath. He completed his early schooling from Lawrence School, Lovedale and then went on to study film making and architecture from Harvard University where he graduated magna cum laude in 1977. In 1981, he completed his MBA from the Harvard Business School.

== Career ==
In 1981, Anand joined Mahindra Ugine Steel Company Ltd (MUSCO) as an Executive Assistant to the Finance Director.

In 1989 he was appointed President and Deputy Managing Director of MUSCO. He initiated the Mahindra Group's diversification into new business areas of real estate development and hospitality management.

On 4 April 1991, he took the role of Deputy Managing Director of Mahindra & Mahindra Ltd., a producer of off-road vehicles and agricultural tractors in India. In April 1997, Anand was appointed the Managing Director and in 2001 the Vice Chairman of Mahindra & Mahindra Ltd.

In August 2012, he took on the role of Chairman of the board and Managing Director of the Mahindra Group from his uncle, Keshub Mahindra.

In November 2016, Anand was re-designated as Executive Chairman of Mahindra & Mahindra Ltd and continued to be the Chairman of Mahindra Group.

Anand was a co-promoter of Kotak Mahindra Bank (formally known as Kotak Mahindra Finance Ltd.). In 2013, he ceased to be a promoter and stayed on as a non-executive director.

Today, the Mahindra Group is a US$19 billion organisation and one of India's top 10 industrial houses.

Anand Mahindra has been tagged as the face of Indian capitalism by The Economist. Forbes India Magazine has recognised him as their 'Entrepreneur of the Year' for the year 2013.

=== Beyond Mahindra ===
In 2014, Anand Mahindra with his brother-in-law and sports commentator, Charu Sharma, launched Pro Kabaddi League, a professional-level kabaddi league in India.

Anand, along with Mukesh Ambani and Mahesh Samat, was the co-founder of EPIC, an Indian television channel in 2014 that showcases Hindi content. In 2016, he became the sole owner after the other two co-founders sold their stakes to him.

Anand was featured in Fortune Magazine's list of The World's 50 Greatest Leaders in 2014 and in the list of the top 25 most powerful business people in Asia in 2011. He was the World Economic Forum co-chairman in 2009. Anand was one of the contributors for the book 'Reimagining India' published by Mckinsey & Company. In 2003, he was elected as the president of the Confederation of Indian Industry.

== Honors and awards ==
Over the years, Anand has received several recognitions including:

State honours

- Knight of the National Order of Merit of France – 2004
- Grand Officer of the Order of the Star of Italy - 16 January 2013
- Knight of the Legion of Honour of France - 2016
- Padma Bhushan - 2020

== Personal life ==
Anand married Anuradha, who was a journalist and later launched the magazine Verve. She is currently the editor of magazines Verve and Man's World. They have two daughters, Divya and Aalika.

He is the founder of project Nanhi Kali which aims to provide primary education to underprivileged girls in India. As of September 2017, the project has supported 130,000 underprivileged girls.
