= Jagdish Chandra Mahindra =

Indian industrialist (1892–1951)

J. C. Mahindra
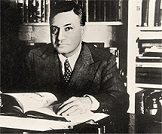
- Born: 1892; Ludhiana, Punjab Province, British India (present day Punjab, India)
- Died: 1951 (aged 58–59)
- Occupation: Co-Founder of Mahindra & Mahindra

Jagdish Chandra Mahindra (1892–1951) was an Indian industrialist and co-founder of Mahindra & Mahindra in 1945, with Kailash Chandra Mahindra and Malik Ghulam Mohammed. He is the grandfather of Anand Mahindra, the present chairman of Mahindra Group.

== Early life and education ==
Born in Ludhiana, Punjab Province, he was the eldest of nine children. The loss of his father at an early age placed the responsibility for the family on his shoulders. He believed strongly in the power of education and ensured that all his brothers and sisters studied hard. He sent his brother Kailash Chandra Mahindra to the University of Cambridge.

Mahindra received his degree from Victoria Jubilee Technological Institute (VJTI) and University of Bombay, one of India's premier engineering and technical institutes.

== Career ==
Mahindra started out his career with Tata Steel, and was the senior sales manager from 1929 to 1940. When the steel industry became critical during World War II, the Government of British India appointed him as the first steel controller of India.

== Mahindra & Mahindra ==
J. C. Mahindra and K. C. Mahindra joined forces with Ghulam Mohammed and started Mahindra & Mohammed as a steel company in Bombay. Two years later, India gained its independence, Ghulam Mohammed left the company to become Pakistan’s first finance minister, and the Mahindra brothers started to manufacture Willys jeeps in Bombay. Soon, the company’s name was changed to Mahindra & Mahindra.

== Death ==
Mahindra died of a heart attack in 1951.
