= Soulmate (band) =

Indian blues rock band

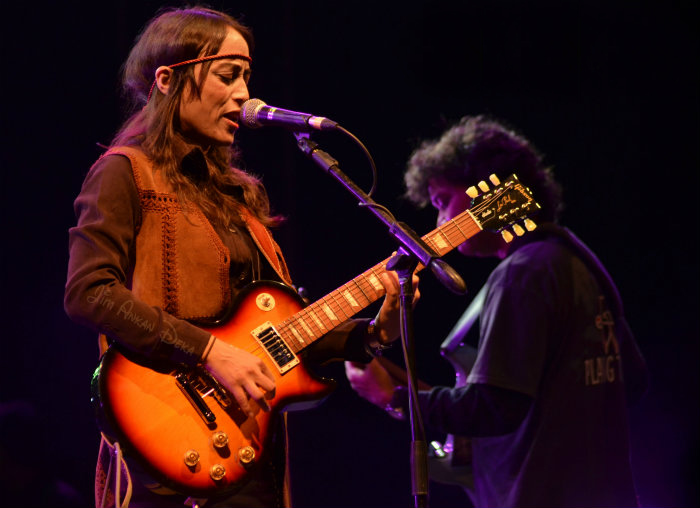
- Soulmate at Harley Rock Riders Season III (2012)

Background information
- Origin: Shillong, India
- Genres: Blues rock
- Years active: 2003–present
- Label: Independent
- Members: Tipriti TIPS Kharbangar; Rudy Wallang
- Website: Soulmate Official Myspace Page

Soulmate was a blues rock band from Shillong, Meghalaya, India. The band is primarily made up of Rudy Wallang (guitar/vocals/songwriter) and Tipriti TIPS Kharbangar (vocals/guitar), although they frequently teamed up with session musicians (on drums, bass, organ and possibly other backup instruments) when on tour. Tipriti is considered one of the finest female singers to have emerged from North East India and Wallang is considered one of the most respected blues guitarists of India.

== History ==
Soulmate was a Shillong-based blues band, which came together in February 2003 playing their first concert at the ‘Roots Festival' at the Water Sports Complex in Umiam. Since then the band has performed many concerts all over The Northeast as well as in different parts of India, Southeast Asia, Europe, The Middle East and The United States.

Soulmate gained nationwide recognition and popularity within jazz and blues circles in India after they became the only blues band to represent the country at the 23rd International Blues Challenge organized by The Blues Foundation of America, in Memphis, Tennessee, USA, in February 2007 and 2010. They were semi-finalists and performed at the Rum Boogie Café (Blues Club of The Year, 2007) and Ground Zero(2010) alongside 150 other bands and musicians from all over the world.

== Festivals and events ==
Soulmate has performed at many prestigious festivals like International Jazzmandu Festival in Kathmandu, Nepal in 2004,2005 and 2008,"Mosaic Music Festival" Singapore in 2009."Du World Music festival" in Dubai 2011, Harley Rock Riders Season III in Bangalore in 2012, Maximum India Festival at Kennedy Center in Washington DC in 2011, Jakarta Blues Festivalin Indonesia in 2009 and 2010, "Monsteros Blues Festival", Sweden, Norway, "Baltic Blues Festival" in Eutin, Germany in 2012 Mahindra Blues Fest in Mumbai in 2011, 2012, 2013 and 2014. Opened for Carlos Santana at the Formula One Rocks 2012 event in Delhi etc. The band also played at Oasis 2013, the cultural fest of BITS, Pilani, which is one of Asia's largest student-organised festivals.

== Awards ==
Tipriti had won the Best Female Vocalist and Rudy won the Best Guitar Player for 2009 in the Jack Daniels Rock Awards.

== Band members ==
- Tipriti 'Tips' Kharbangar (Vocals, Rhythm guitar, Songwriter)
- Rudy Wallang (Vocals, Lead guitar, Songwriter)

=== Discography ===
- Shillong (2004)
- Moving On (2009)
- Ten stories up (2014)

== See also ==
- Music of India
- Indian rock
