= Project Nanhi Kali =

Girl's educational project in India

Project Nanhi Kali is an Indian non-governmental organisation that supports education for underprivileged girls in India.

== History ==
Founded by Anand Mahindra in 1996, it is jointly managed by the Naandi Foundation and the KC Mahindra Education Trust, which is part of the corporate social responsibility activities of the Mahindra Group. Currently, Project Nanhi Kali supports over 57,000 students.

=== Background ===
Project Nanhi Kali sees educating girls and women as a way to positively impact India in the long run. Sheetal Mehta, the president of the non-profit organisation, told the Daily News and Analysis in an interview that "we wanted to create global awareness about the plight of young girls in the country who are denied their basic right."

Students who are selected for Nanhi Kali receive both financial and academic support. They attend special classes to learn math, science, and language concepts. Nanhi Kali pays for the hidden costs of their education, including pencils, notebooks, school bags, uniforms, clothes, and shoes. Funding is from individual and corporate donors, who sponsor a particular child and receive regular updates on her progress at school. Sponsors can also go to the online "Gift Store" to purchase particular items for a student. The Mahindra Group sponsors the education of 11,000 girl children through Project Nanhi Kali.

Third-party assessments show that Nanhi Kali has a significant impact on the girls' lives. Over a one-year period, Nanhi Kali students' improvement in learning outcomes ranged from 40 percent in tribal Chhattisgarh to 78 percent in Mumbai.
