= Kailash Chandra Mahindra =

Indian industrialist (1894–1963)

K. C. Mahindra
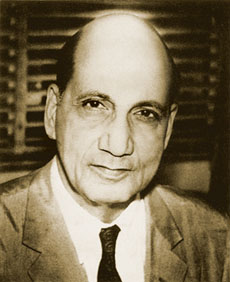
- Born: 1894; Ludhiana, Punjab Province, British India (present-day Punjab, India)
- Died: 1963 (aged 68–69)
- Occupation: Co-Founder of Mahindra & Mahindra

Kailash Chandra Mahindra (1894–1963) was an Indian industrialist, who co-founded Mahindra & Mohammed in 1945 which was later renamed as Mahindra & Mahindra in 1948, with Jagdish Chandra Mahindra.

== Early life and education ==
Kailash Chandra Mahindra, known to all as KC, was born in 1894 in Ludhiana, Punjab Province, the second of nine children. When their father died at an early age, his older brother Jagdish Chandra became head of the family, and KC his best friend and future business partner.

KC attended Government College, Lahore, where his scholastic aptitude shone through. At the University of Cambridge, he earned Honours, played hockey, and took a keen interest in rowing. After graduating, he joined Messrs. Martin & Company, where he edited the monthly magazine INDIA and, briefly, the Hindustan Review.

== Career ==
In 1942, KC was appointed Head of the Indian Purchasing Mission in the United States. Returning to India in 1945, he was appointed the Chairman of the Indian Coal Fields Committee of the Government of India and also of the Automobile and Tractor panel. His contribution to developing strategic coal policies and applying the latest methods of coal mining in India helped shape the industry, and his Coal Commission Report became a seminal document in the industry. During these years, he also wrote Sir Rajendra Nath Mookerjee's definitive biography.

== Mahindra & Mahindra ==
In 1946, KC moved to Bombay (now called Mumbai) and found Mahindra & Mahindra. Under his 13-year stewardship as chairman, Mahindra & Mahindra established itself as a major Indian industrial house in several sectors. A glittering career also saw KC serve as a Director of the Reserve Bank of India, Air India, and Hindustan Steel.
