= List of diesel automobiles =

The following is a list of automobiles (including pickup trucks, SUVs, and vans) made with diesel engines.

== Alfa Romeo ==
Former

- 145
- 146
- 147
- 155
- 156
- 159
- 164
- 166
- 33
- 75
- 90
- Alfa 6
- Alfetta
- Brera
- GT
- Giulietta
- MiTo

Current

- Giulia
- Stelvio

== Audi ==
Former

- 80
- 90
- 100
- 4000
- 5000
- Allroad
- A2
- A4

Current

- A1
- A3
- A5
- A6
- A7
- A8
- Q2
- Q3
- Q5
- Q7
- Q8

== Buick ==
Former

- Century
- Electra
- LeSabre
- Riviera

Current

- Regal

== BMW ==
Former

- 6 Series

Current

- 1 Series
- 2 Series
- 3 Series
- 4 Series
- 5 Series
- 7 Series
- 8 Series (G15)
- X1
- X2
- X3
- X4
- X5
- X6
- X7

== Cadillac ==
Former

- BLS 1.9D

== Chery ==
- Himla
- Stockman

== Chevrolet ==
- Blazer
- C10 Pickup
- C1500
- C20 Pickup
- C2500
- C30 Pickup
- C3500
- Caprice
- Celebrity
- Chevette
- Colorado
- Cruze (2017-2019)
- El Camino
- E Series (2006)
- Equinox (2018-2019)
- G20 Van
- G2500 Van
- G30 Van
- G3500 Van
- Impala
- K10 Pickup
- K1500
- K20 Pickup
- K2500
- K30 Pickup
- K3500
- Kodiak (2005)
- Luv
- Malibu
- Monte Carlo
- P20 Van
- P30 Van
- R10 Pickup
- R20 Pickup
- R2500
- R30 Pickup
- R3500
- Silverado (2006)
- Suburban
- Tahoe
- V10 Pickup
- V30 Pickup
- V3500 Pickup

== Chrysler ==
Former

- Chrysler 300M
- Chrysler 300C

== Citroën ==
Former

- AX
- BX
- CX
- C1
- C2
- C6
- C8
- Evasion
- Saxo
- Visa
- Xantia
- XM
- Xsara
- Xsara Picasso
- ZX

Current

- Berlingo
- C3
- C4
- C5
- Jumpy
- Jumper

== Covini ==
- Covini T44
- Covini T46
- Covini T40
- Covini B24 Turbo
- Covini C36

== Cupra ==
- Formentor

== Dacia ==
Former

- Papucs
- Solenza

Current

- Duster
- Logan
- Sandero

== Dodge ==
- Ram 2500 HD
- Ram 3500 HD
- Ram 4500 HD
- Sprinter
- Ram 50

== Fiat ==
Former

- 131
- 132
- Argenta
- Albea
- Bravo/Brava
- Croma
- Duna/Prêmio
- Elba
- Fullback
- Idea
- Marea
- Multipla
- Palio
- Punto
- Palio Weekend
- Regata
- Strada
- Sedici
- Siena
- Stilo
- Fiat Tempra
- Tipo
- Ulysse
- Uno

Current

- Doblò
- Ducato
- Fiorino
- Panda
- Scudo
- Strada
- Titano

== Ford ==
- Bronco (1983–1996)
- E-Series
- Escort (1984–1987)
- Excursion
- F-Series (1983–1997)
- Fiesta
- Fusion
- Galaxy
- Lion VLE
- Mondeo
- Focus
- Focus C-MAX
- Ranger
- S-MAX (2006–2023)
- Super Duty
- Tempo (1984–1986)
- Tourneo
- Figo
- Figo Aspire
- Endeavour

== International ==
- Scout II (1980)

== GMC ==
- Savana (2006)
- Sierra (2005)
- Topkick (2005)

== Holden ==
- Gemini

== Honda ==
- CR-V
- Civic

== Hummer ==
- Hummer H1

== Hyundai ==
Former

- Entourage
- Getz
- H-1/Starex
- Matrix
- Terracan
- Trajet
- Veracruz

Current

- Accent
- Elantra
- i30
- Santa Fe
- Tucson

== Infiniti ==
- EX
- FX
- M

== Isuzu ==
- Faster

== Jaguar ==
Former

- F-Pace
- XE
- XF
- XJ
- E-Pace
- X-Type
- S-Type (1999)

== Jeep ==
Former

- Liberty (2005–2006)

Current

- Cherokee
- Grand Cherokee
- Wrangler
- Gladiator

== Kia ==
- Carens
- Carnival
- cee'd
- Mohave
- Sorento
- Soul
- Sportage
- Tasman
- Venga

== Lancia ==
Former

- Dedra
- Delta
- Kappa
- Lybra
- Musa
- Phedra
- Prisma
- Thesis
- Thema
- Zeta

Current

- Ypsilon

== Land Rover ==
Former

- Freelander TD4

Current

- Defender
- Discovery TDV6
- Range Rover Sport TDV6
- Range Rover TDV8

== Lexus ==
- IS 220d
- LX 450d

== Lincoln ==
- Continental Mark VII

== Mahindra ==
- Scorpio
- XUV500
- KUV100
- Xylo
- Bolero
- TUV300
- Quanto
- Nuvosport
- Thar
- XUV300

== Maserati ==
- Ghibli (M157)
- Quattroporte (M156)
- Levante

== Mazda ==
- Mazda2
- Mazda3
- Mazda6
- CX-3
- CX-5
- CX-8
- BT-50

== Mercedes-Benz ==
Former

- W110
- W120
- W123
- W124
- W201
- W136
- W126
- CLC-Class
- CLK-Class
- CLS-Class
- R-Class
- SLK-Class
- X-Class
- Vario

Current

- A-Class
- B-Class
- C-Class
- E-Class
- S-Class
- CLA-Class
- GLA-Class
- GLC-Class
- GLE-Class
- GLS-Class
- G-Class
- Citan
- Vito
- Sprinter

== Mercury ==
Former

- Lynx
- Topaz

== MG ==
Former

- ZR
- ZS
- ZT
- MG6

Current

- Extender
- Hector
- Gloster/Majestor
- MGU9

== Mini ==
Former

- Coupé/Roadster
- Clubman
- Hatch
- Paceman

Current

- Countryman

== Mitsubishi ==
- Lancer
- L200
- Libero
- Pajero
- Delica
- Adventure

== Nissan ==
- Almera
- Primera
- Terrano
- X-Trail
- Sentra
- Maxima
- Patrol
- Pathfinder
- Caravan
- 720
- Navara
- Titan

== Opel ==
Former

- Ascona
- Agila
- Antara
- Blitz
- Cascada
- Frontera
- Insignia
- Kadett
- Meriva
- Movano A/B
- Omega
- Rekord
- Senator
- Signum
- Sintra
- Vectra
- Zafira Tourer

Current

- Astra
- Combo
- Corsa
- Mokka
- Movano C
- Vivaro

== Peugeot ==
Former

- 106
- 107
- 204
- 205
- 206
- 207
- 304
- 305
- 306
- 307
- 309
- 404
- 405
- 406
- 407
- 504
- 505
- 604
- 605
- 607
- 806
- 807
- 1007
- Pick Up

Current

- Boxer
- Landtrek
- Partner

== Renault ==
Former

- 9
- 11
- 18
- 19
- 20/30
- 25
- Fuego
- Laguna
- Mégane
- Modus
- Safrane
- Vel Statis

Current

- Clio
- Espace
- Kangoo
- Scénic

== Rover ==
Former

- 100
- 200
- 25
- 400
- 45
- 620
- 75
- 800
- Metro
- SD1
- Maestro
- Montego

== Saab ==
Former

- 9-3
- 9-5

== SEAT ==
Former

- Arosa
- Alhambra
- Altea / Altea XL / Freetrack
- Córdoba
- Exeo
- Inca
- Málaga/Gredos
- Toledo

Current

- Ibiza / Ibiza SC / Ibiza ST
- León

== Škoda ==
Former

- Felicia

Current

- Fabia
- Octavia
- Superb

== Smart ==
Former

- Roadster
- Fortwo
- Forfour

== Suzuki ==
Former

- Aerio/Liana
- Vitara/Sidekick/Escudo
- Esteem/Baleno
- XL-7

Current

- Grand Vitara
- Ignis
- Jimny
- Swift
- SX4
- Wagon R
- Vitara Brezza
- Dzire
- Ertiga

== Talbot ==
Former

- Horizon
- Tagora

== Tata ==
- Telcoline
- Sumo
- Safari
- Spacio
- Victa
- Ace
- 407
- 1512
- Novus
- Hexa
- Tigor
- Tiago
- Nexon

== Toyota ==
- Avensis
- Camry
- Corolla
- Chaser
- Hiace
- Hilux
- Land Cruiser
- Land Cruiser Prado
- RAV4
- Yaris
- Caldina
- Avanza
- Etios

== Vauxhall ==
- Carlton

== Volkswagen ==
Former

- Ameo
- Beetle
- Phaeton
- CC
- Fox
- Lupo
- Sharan
- Tiguan Limited
- Vento
- Vanagon

Current

- Polo
- Golf
- Jetta
- Passat
- Arteon
- T-Roc
- Touareg
- Atlas
- Touran
- Bora
- Caddy
- Transporter

== Volvo ==
Former

- 240
- 260
- 440
- 460
- 740
- 760
- 940
- 960
- C70
- C70
- S40
- S60
- S80
- S90
- V40
- V50
- V70
- V90
- XC70

Current

- XC60
- XC90
