= Mahindra Maxx =

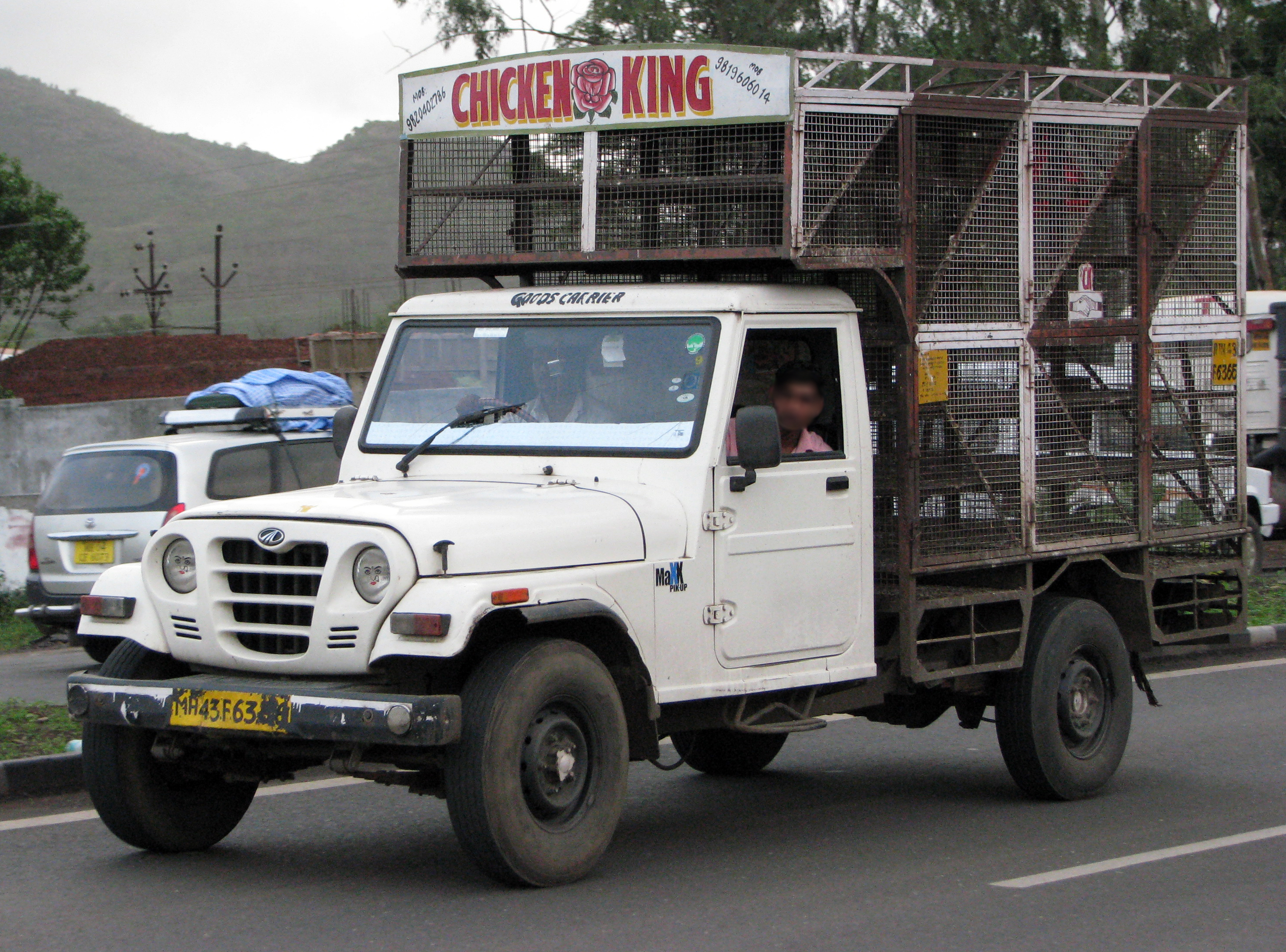
- Mahindra Maxx Pik Up

Overview
- Manufacturer: Mahindra & Mahindra
- Also called: Mahindra Maximum
- Production: 2001–2010

Body and chassis
- Class: MUV
- Body style: 2-door
- Related: Mahindra Bolero Camper; Mahindra Scorpio

Powertrain
- Engine: 2.5 L I4
- Transmission: 4-speed manual

Chronology
- Predecessor: Mahindra Armada
- Successor: Mahindra Bolero Camper

The Mahindra Maxx (or MaXX) is an offroad Pickup truck which was launched in 2001 in nine- or ten-seat station wagon form. It replaced the earlier Armada Station Wagon. Mahindra & Mahindra took it out of production in 2010. From September 2003 on this vehicle was also available in pick-up variants known as the Maxx maxitruck or Maxx Pik Up. There was also a better equipped wagon version called the Maxx LX.

The Maxx is available in pik-up truck with two doors with a 2.5-liter inline-four cylinder diesel engine, either naturally aspirated or turbocharged. Power outputs are 58 and 63 hp (43 and 47 kW) while the torque is either 180 or 200 N⋅m (133 or 148 lb⋅ft). The regular Maxx had leaf spring suspension at both front and rear, drum brakes all around, and a four-speed manual transmission. Later versions received disc brakes up front and other improvements.
