= Mahindra Scorpio Getaway =

Pickup truck

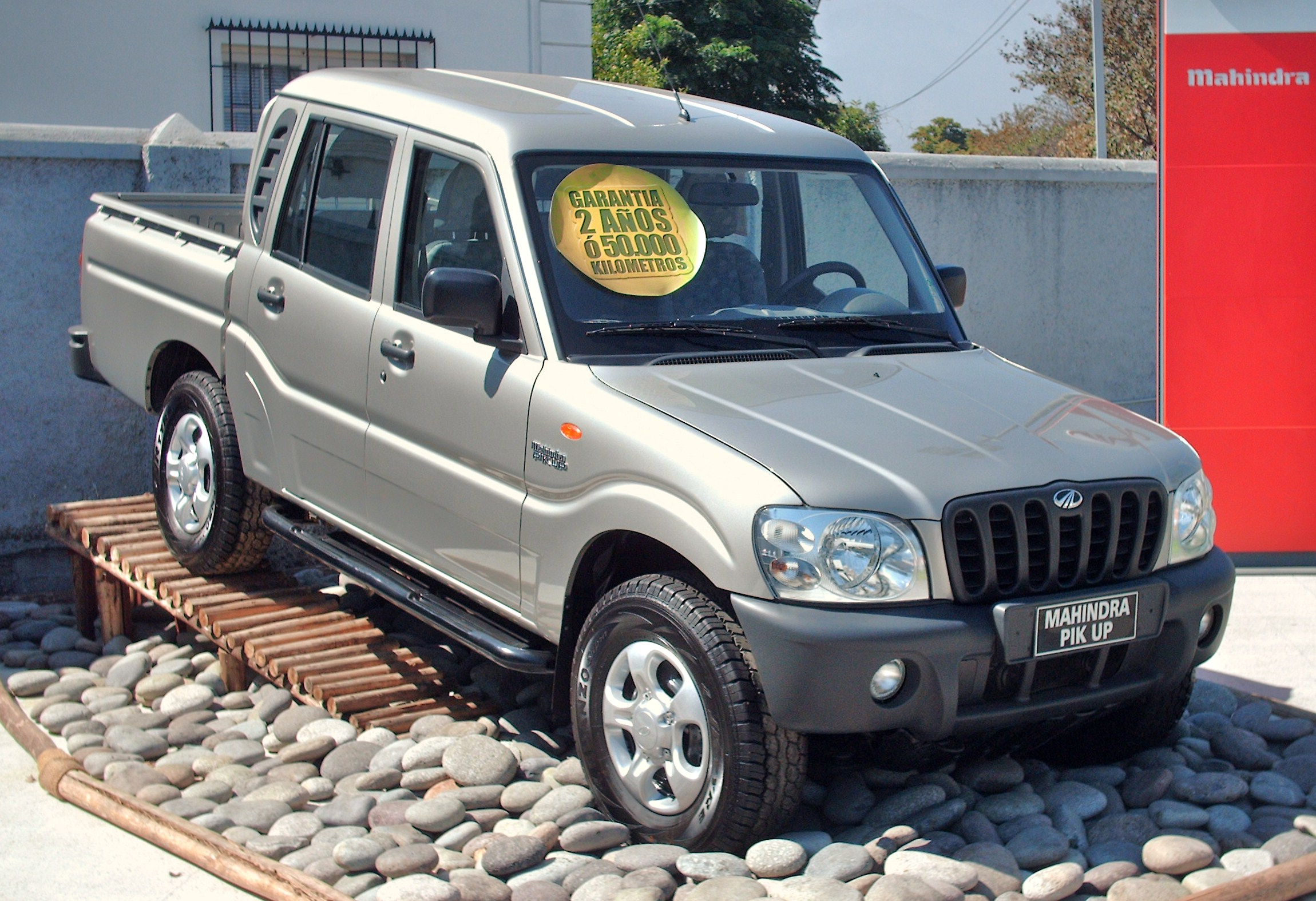

Overview
- Manufacturer: Mahindra & Mahindra Limited
- Also called: Mahindra Scorpio Pik-Up; Mahindra Goa Pik-Up (Europe); Mahindra Pik-Up
- Production: April 2006 - present
- Assembly: Nasik, Maharashtra, India; Chakan, Maharashtra; Durban, South Africa

Body and chassis
- Class: Mid-size pickup truck
- Body style: 2-door single cab; 4-door double cab
- Layout: Front-engine, rear-wheel-drive; Front-engine, four-wheel-drive
- Related: Mahindra Scorpio

Chronology
- Predecessor: Mahindra Bolero Camper

The Mahindra Scorpio Getaway is mid-size pickup truck manufactured by the Indian automaker Mahindra & Mahindra. It is essentially the pickup truck variant of the Mahindra Scorpio SUV and was launched in April 2006.

As of October 2019, in addition to India, the Scorpio Getaway is also sold in Australia, New Zealand, South Africa, Chile, Italy, Nepal and Indonesia along with the GCC countries, African and Latin American countries. It competes with the Tata Xenon in India and Toyota Hilux in globally.

== First generation (Project Scorpio; 2006) ==
Mahindra Scorpio Getaway
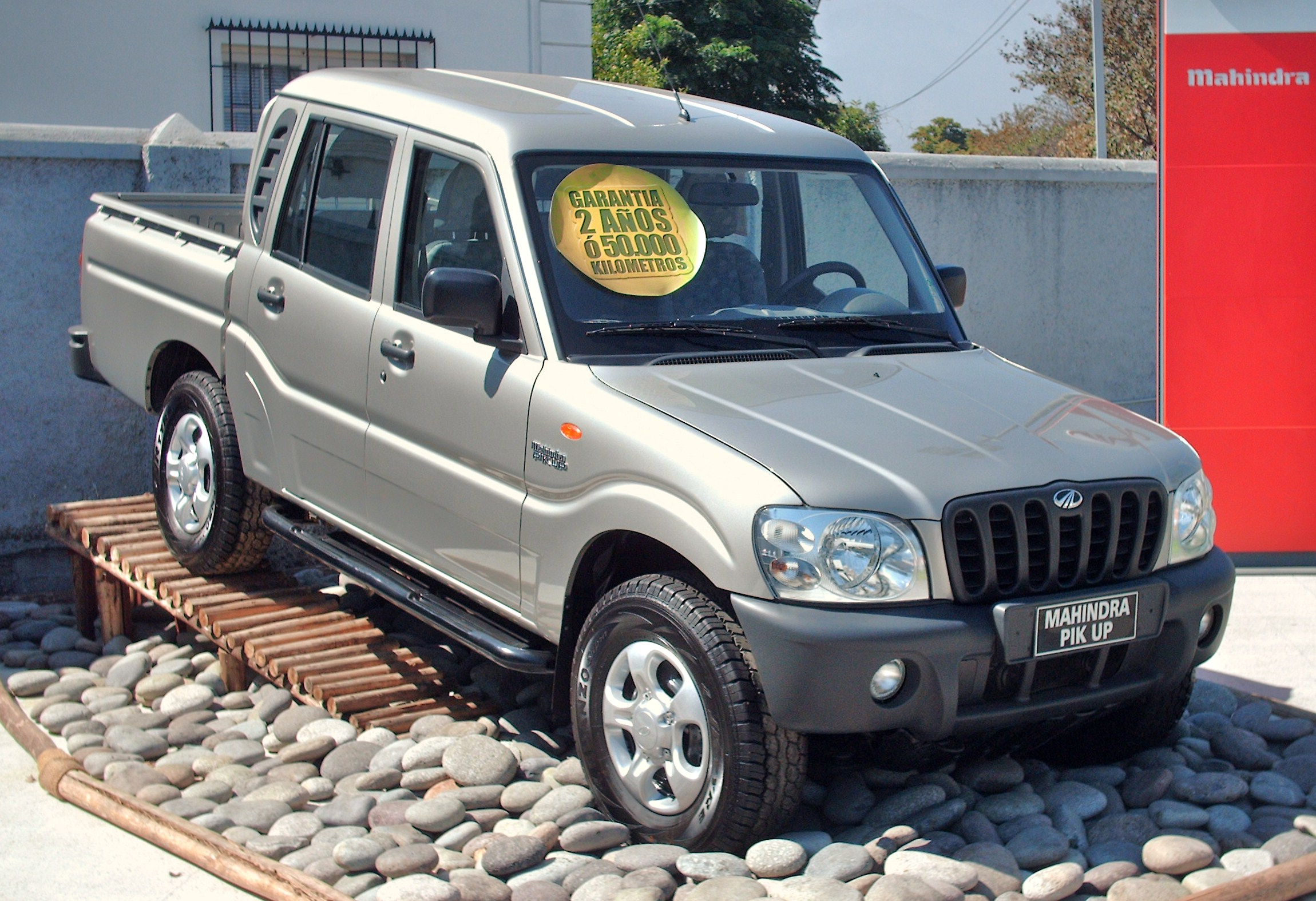

Overview
- Manufacturer: Mahindra & Mahindra Limited
- Also called: Mahindra Scorpio Pik-Up; Mahindra Goa Pik-Up (Europe); Mahindra Pik-Up
- Production: April 2006-present
- Assembly: Nasik, Maharashtra, India; Chakan, Maharashtra; Durban, South Africa

Powertrain
- Engine: 2.2 L mHawk I4; 2.5 L m2DICR S2 I4; 2.6 L SZ CRDe I4
- Transmission: 5-speed manual; 6-speed manual; 6-speed automatic

Dimensions
- Wheelbase: 3,040 mm (120 in)
- Length: 5,098 mm (200.7 in)
- Width: 1,850 mm (73 in)
- Height: 1,874 mm (73.8 in)
- Curb weight: 1,760–2,060 kg (3,880–4,542 lb)

=== Overview ===
In India, the Scorpio Getaway is only available in a 4-door double cab, however, in some selected markets, a 2-door single cab is also offered, along with the double cab model. It is available in 2WD or 4WD configurations with low range.

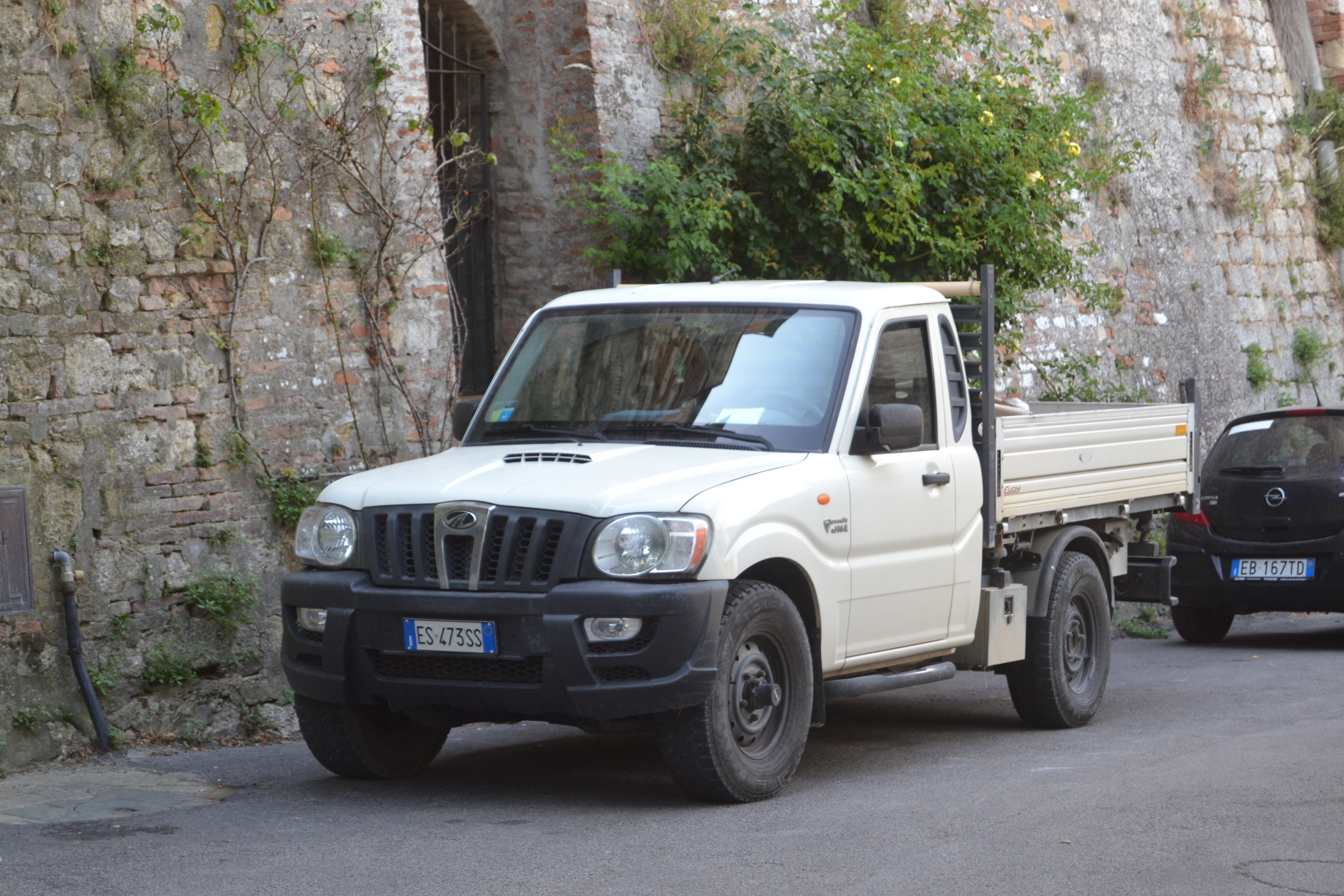
Mahindra Pik-up

Safety features of the vehicle includes crash protecting crumple zones, child lock, collapsible steering and side intrusion beams. Additional features includes tubeless tires, voice assist system, touchscreen infotainment system with Bluetooth and navigation, and remote lock/unlock system.

The Scorpio Getaway has an approach angle of 34 degrees, a departure angle of 15 degrees and a breakover angle of 18 degrees. It features a mechanical locking differential, manufactured by the Eaton Corporation, which provides ‘shift-on-the-fly’ on the rear axle to help with off-roading.

In South Africa, it was launched there in April 2006 as the Mahindra Scorpio Pik-Up initially with SZ CRDe 2.6L engine and later it used the same 2.2-litre engine but has a compression ratio of 16.5:1 and delivers to 140 PS (138 hp; 103 kW) @3750rpm and 320 N⋅m (236.0 lb⋅ft) @1500-2800rpm. The facelifted model was later launched in October 2017, thus renaming it simply as the Mahindra Pik-Up.

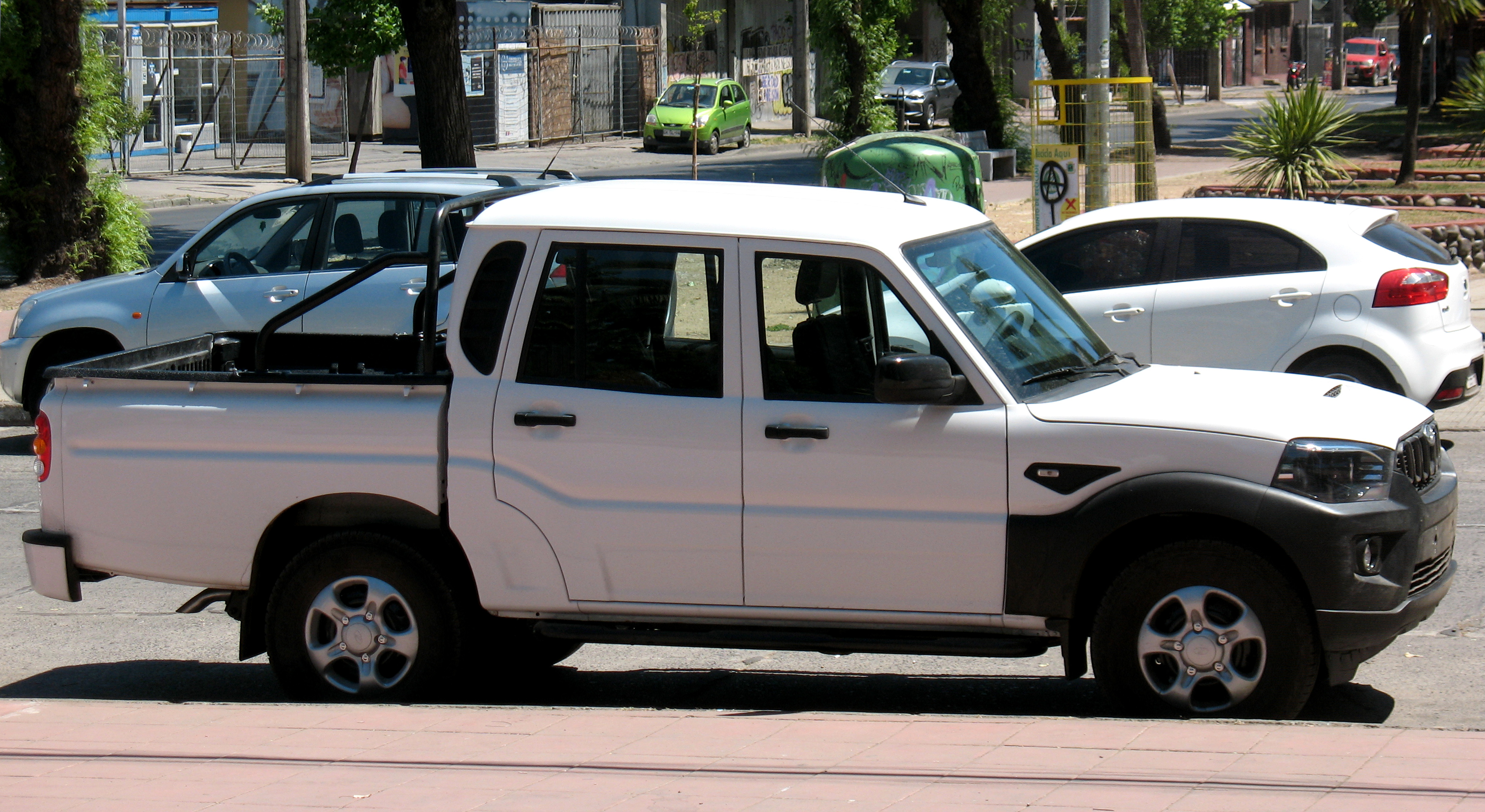
2022 Mahindra Pik-up D140 S4

In Australia, the Mahindra Scorpio Getaway was launched as the Mahindra Pik-Up in April 2009, with sales began starting from the western continent in November 2009. It was powered by a 2.5-litre CRDe diesel engine, delivering 79kW and 247Nm. Starting in 2011 the engine was changed to the 2.2-litre mHawk diesel with a compression ration of 18.5:1, delivering 119 PS (117 hp; 88 kW) @4000rpm and 280 N⋅m (206.5 lb⋅ft) @1800rpm. The Pik-Up was also launched in New Zealand in 2014. A facelifted Pik-Up was launched in 2018 with the introduction of a redesigned interior & exterior, touch-screen audio and 6-speed manual, while the new revision 2.2-litre mHawk diesel engine now made 140 PS (138 hp; 103 kW) and 330 N⋅m (243.4 lb⋅ft) from 1600rpm-2800rpm. The Scorpio Getaway was launched in Indonesia on 17 October 2019, marketed as the Mahindra Scorpio Pik-Up. It is available there either a single cab or a double cab and powered by the same 2.2-litre mHawk diesel engine.

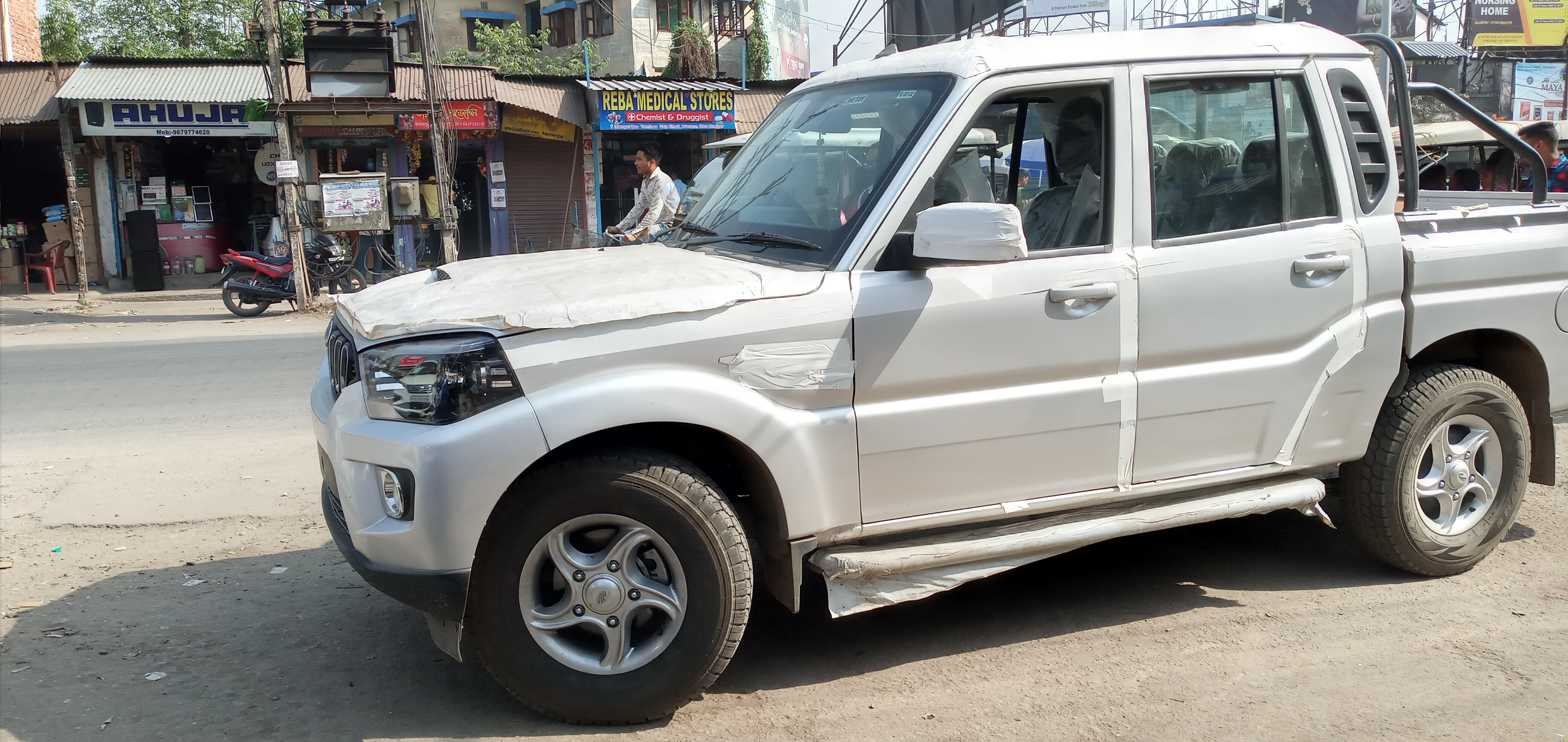
Side view

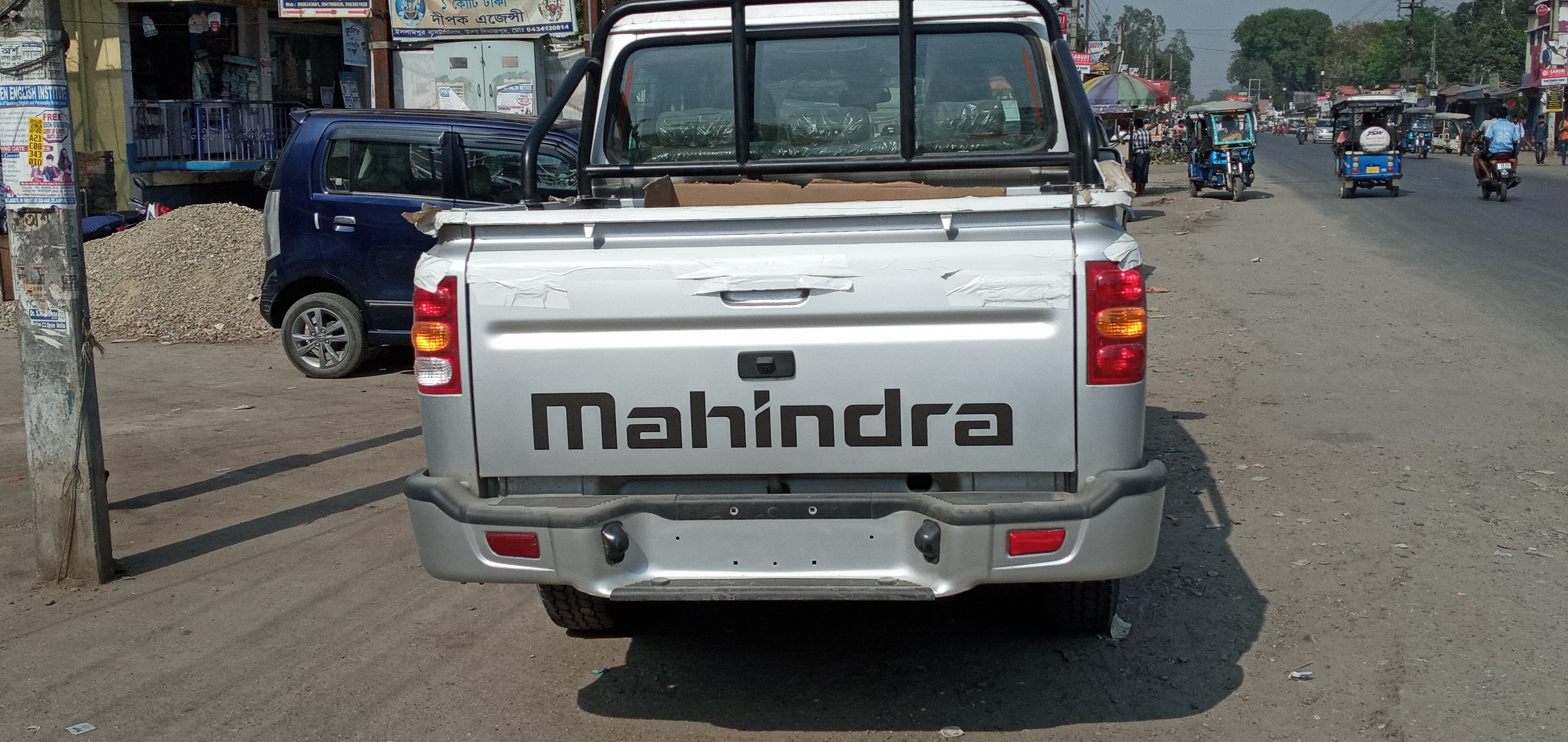
Rear view

=== Safety ===
ANCAP test results Mahindra Pik-Up (2008)
Test	Score
Overall	2 /5 stars
Frontal offset	2.39/16
Side impact	16/16
Pole	Not Assessed
Seat belt reminders	0/3
Whiplash protection	Not Assessed
Pedestrian protection	Poor
Electronic stability control	Not Available

ANCAP test results Mahindra Pik-Up (2009)
Test	Score
Overall	2 /5 stars
Frontal offset	3.44/16
Side impact	16/16
Pole	Not Assessed
Seat belt reminders	0/3
Whiplash protection	Not Assessed
Pedestrian protection	Marginal
Electronic stability control	Not Available

ANCAP test results Mahindra Pik-Up (2012)
Test	Score
Overall	3 /5 stars
Frontal offset	6.60/16
Side impact	16/16
Pole	Not Assessed
Seat belt reminders	0/3
Whiplash protection	Not Assessed
Pedestrian protection	Poor
Electronic stability control	Not Available

=== Specification ===
It features a 5-speed manual transmission, or 6-speed manual (Pik-Up), front double wish-bone suspension with semi-elliptical leaf springs, front disc brakes, rear drum brakes, a 80 L (21 US gal; 18 imp gal) fuel tank, and a gross vehicle weight of 2,550 kg (5,622 lb) for 2WD, 2,650 kg (5,842 lb) for 4WD.

Engines
Engine	Capacity	Power	Torque	Cylinders	Valves	Configuration	Aspiration	Fuel Injection	Fuel type
SZ CRDe (SA)	2,609 cc (2.6 L)	95 kW (127.4 hp)@3800 RPM	295 N⋅m (217.0 lbf⋅ft)@1200-2800 RPM	4	4	Inline	Turbo	Direct Injection	Diesel
mHawk	2,179 cc (2.2 L)	103 kW (138.1 hp)@4000 RPM	320 N⋅m (236.0 lbf⋅ft)@1500-2800 RPM	4	4 DOHC	Inline	Variable Geometry Turbo (VGT)	Common Fuel Rail	Diesel
m2DICR S2	2,523 cc (2.5 L)	55.9 kW (75 hp)@3200 RPM	200 N⋅m (147.5 lbf⋅ft)@1400-2200 RPM	4	4	Inline	Turbo	Direct Injection	Diesel

== Second generation (Z121; 2026) ==
Mahindra Scorpio Lifestyler

Overview
- Manufacturer: Mahindra & Mahindra Limited
- Also called: Mahindra Lifestyler
- Production: 2026 (to commence)

The second generation Scorpio Pickup was previewed as the concept model called the Global Pik-up on August 15, 2023. On 14th August 2026 Mahindra unveiled the Global Pik Up and it is to be launched as Mahindra Scorpio Lifestyler for Indian market and Mahindra Lifestyler for international market.
