= Mahindra Armada =

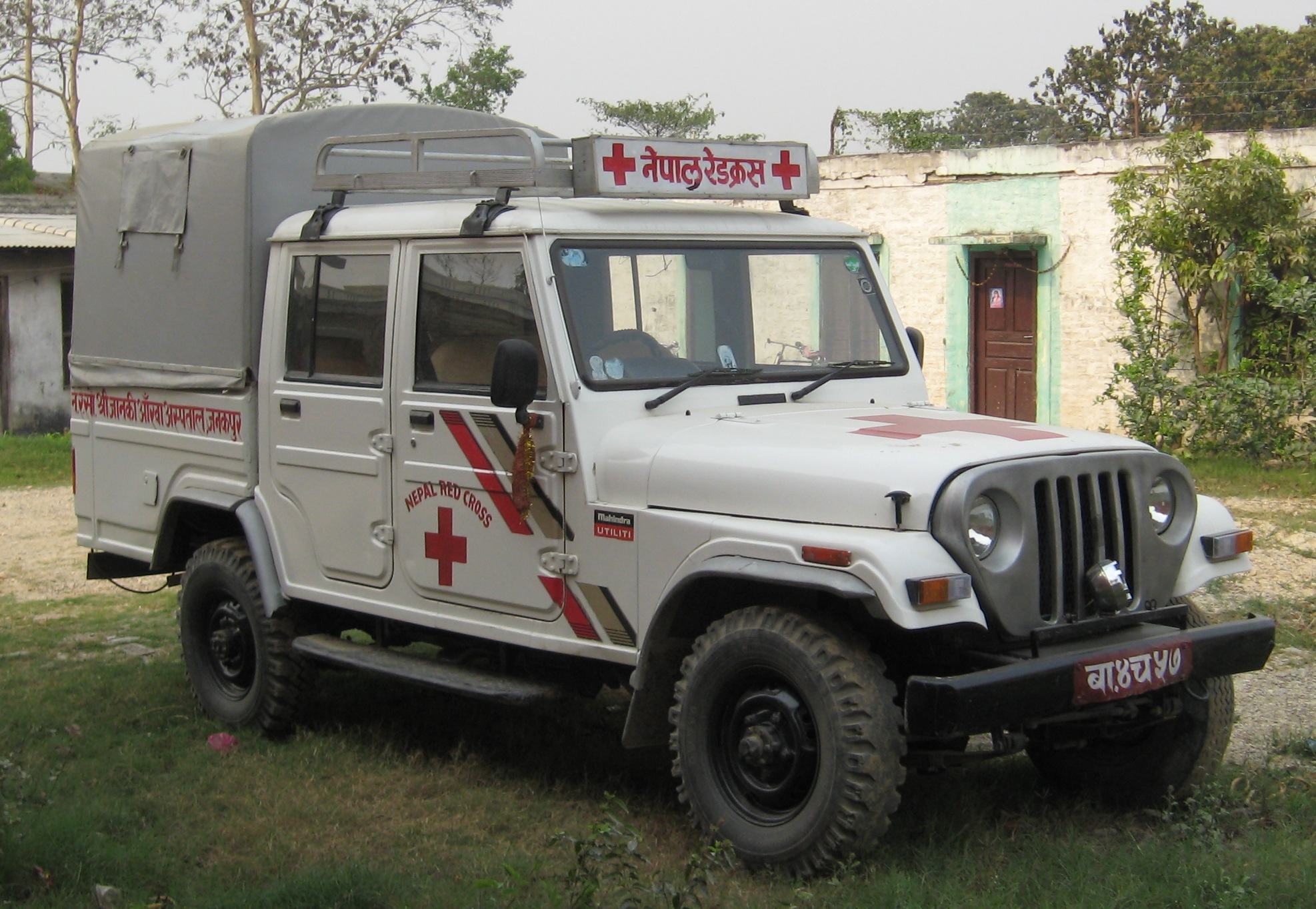
- Ambulance (Mahindra Utiliti, a double-cab pickup version of the Armada)

Overview
- Manufacturer: Mahindra and Mahindra Limited
- Also called: Mahindra Armada Grand (1998–2001)
- Production: 1993–2001

Body and chassis
- Class: Sport utility vehicle
- Body style: 4-door SUV

Powertrain
- Engine: 2112 cc XDP 4.90 diesel I4; 2498 cc XD3P diesel I4
- Transmission: 4-speed all-synchromesh manual, optional 4-wheel drive

Dimensions
- Wheelbase: 2,680 mm (105.5 in)
- Length: 4,305 mm (169.5 in)
- Width: 1,720 mm (67.7 in)
- Height: 1,783 mm (70.2 in)
- Curb weight: 2WD: 1,465 kg (3,230 lb); 4WD: 1,580 kg (3,480 lb)

Chronology
- Predecessor: MM775
- Successor: Mahindra Maxx

The Mahindra Armada was a sports utility vehicle (SUV) and multiutility vehicle (MUV) based on the Jeep. It was produced in India from 1993 until 2001. As of 1998 it was complemented by the more luxurious "Armada Grand"; both were replaced by the Mahindra Maxx in 2001. The Armada, the Grand, and the Bolero were all intended for urban market segments where Mahindra had hitherto been underrepresented.

== Origin ==
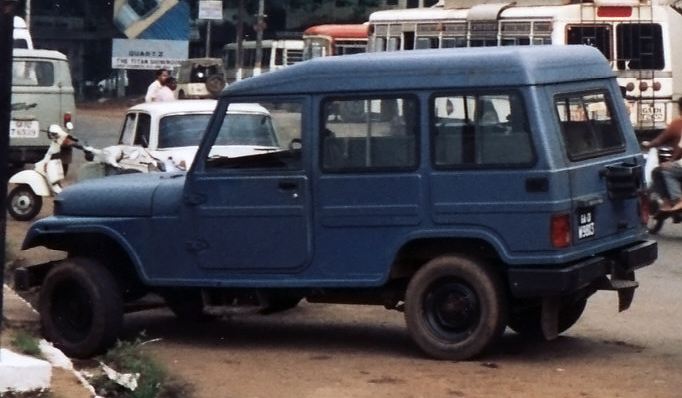
The Mahindra MM775 Hardtop 3-door, a predecessor to the Armada

The design of the Armada began with the Jeep. In the mid-1950s, Willys Motors made the Jeep CJ-5. From this vehicle, the MM540 Jeep was developed. The automotive firm, "Mahindra & Mahindra", developed the MM775 and Marshal series of steel-bodied estates with a long wheel base and three or five doors. The first one, the MM775, arrived in 1992 although a long-wheelbase five-door "Metal Wagonette" of the MM540 had been available in limited numbers since 1987. This, however, was a custom job with handbuilt bodies of low quality and was not cost effective. The later Armada was the 'upscale' version of these cars, a flagship model aimed at a more urban market than Mahindra's usual clientele.

== Design ==
The Mahindra Armada had smaller wheels and lower-profile tires than other Mahindra Jeeps, giving it a lower stance and center of gravity. Thus, it was suited more to on road driving. Later models have disc brakes. It was originally fitted with Peugeot's 2.1-liter XDP 4.90 diesel engine with 62 PS (46 kW) and was available in either a two- or a four-wheel drive version. A later 2.5 L Peugeot XD3P diesel engine gave the Armada a maximum speed of 100 km/h.

=== Exterior ===
Exterior design features included the flatter Bolero-style roofline; rectangular headlamps; body graphics; tacked-on plastic or fiberglass pieces in the grille area and on the wheel arches and bumpers. All this to indicate the car's upscale nature and to set it apart from its more utilitarian cousins.

=== Interior ===
The Armada's interior features included air conditioning; molded plastic dashboards with an effectively placed instrument cluster; and an 8-passenger seating arrangement with the option of fold-down front and rear seats. The Armada likely represents the first attempt by any Indian firm to offer to the public what later became known as an MUV / SUV - an incrementally more upscale, comfortable, and road-oriented version of what had been a spartan, rugged, dirt-track utility vehicle.

== Armada Grand ==
The Armada was joined by the more luxurious Armada Grand, which was first shown in 1996. It went on sale in 1998. It has power windows and power steering; revised interior features and plastic grille; and an electro-mechanical 4x4 selector.

At the 2000 motor show in New Delhi the Armada Grand LX was shown; it had a completely new design in front-end bodywork, independent front suspension (on two-wheel drive models), a five-speed gearbox and much improved sound insulation. It was considered more upscale even though it was missing simple features such as a windscreen defogger. When it went on sale in August 2000, it received the name Mahindra Bolero.
