= Mahindra Bolero Neo =

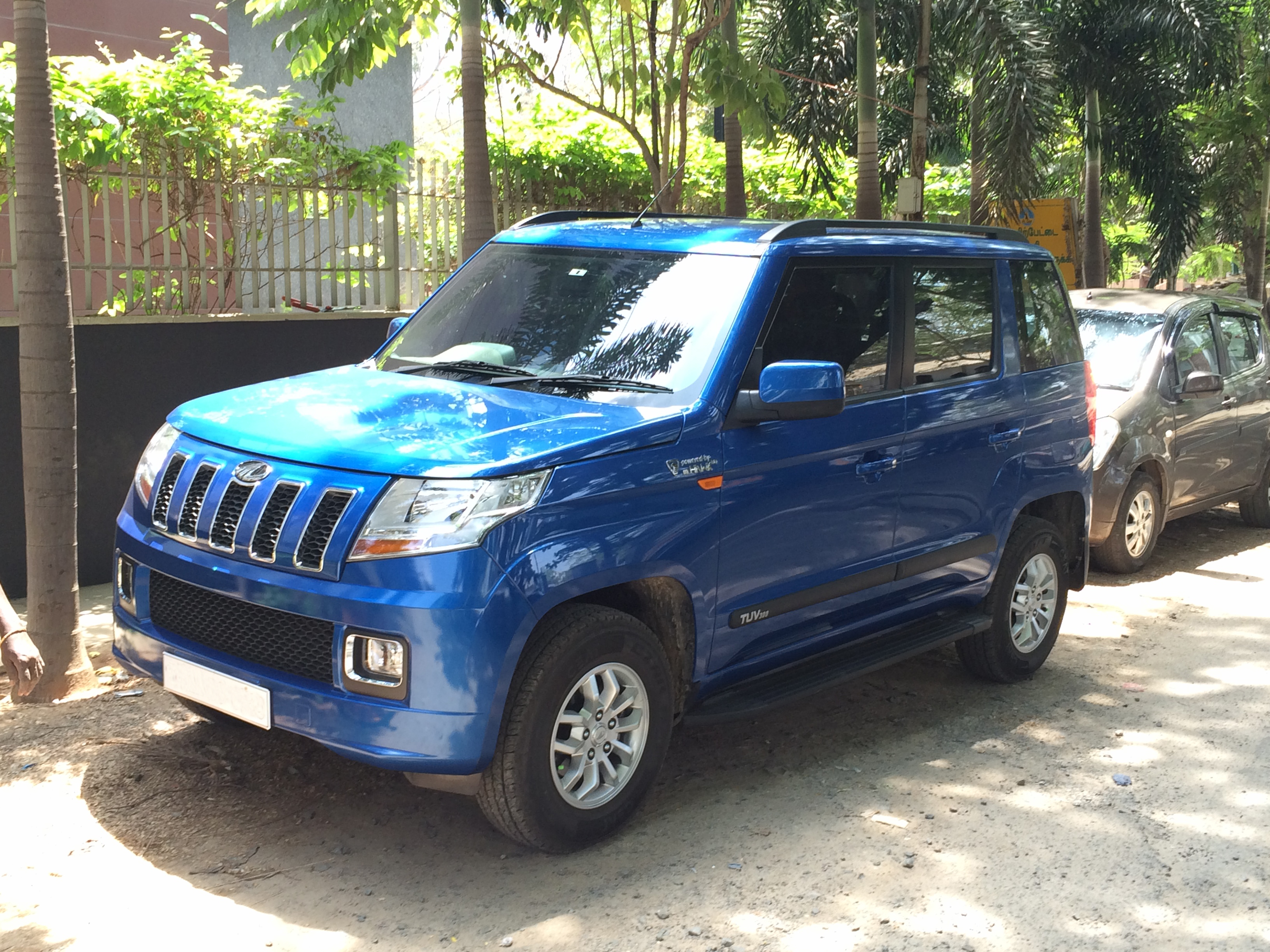
- Mahindra TUV300 (2016-2019)

Overview
- Manufacturer: Mahindra & Mahindra Limited
- Production: 2015–2020 (TUV300); 2021–present (Bolero Neo)
- Assembly: India: Chakan; Nasik

Body and chassis
- Class: Mini SUV
- Body style: 5-door SUV
- Layout: Front-engine, rear-wheel-drive
- Related: Mahindra Scorpio; Mahindra Bolero

Powertrain
- Engine: 1.5 L mHawk I3 diesel; 2.2 L (Bolero Neo Plus) DW12 mHawk I4 diesel
- Transmission: 5-speed manual; 5-speed automated manual

Dimensions
- Wheelbase: 2,680 mm (105.51 in)
- Length: 3,995 mm (157.28 in)
- Width: 1,835 mm (72.24 in)
- Height: 1,839 mm (72.4 in)
- Curb weight: 3,637 lb (1,650 kg)

Chronology
- Predecessor: Mahindra Quanto

The Mahindra Bolero Neo (Formerly Mahindra TUV 300) is a mini SUV manufactured by the Indian automaker Mahindra & Mahindra since 2015.

== History ==
First announced by Mahindra & Mahindra in August 2015 as TUV 300, the microsite of the vehicle went live by the same month. The vehicle was officially launched on September 10, 2015 in Madhya Pradesh. It is built on the same platform as the Mahindra Scorpio. It employs the same mHawk engine series as the XUV500 and Scorpio but with a smaller engine displacement resulting in a lower engine power and torque.

== Design ==
The Bolero Neo was Mahindra's attempt to create a more modernised Bolero which was a proven car but with dated design and equipment. It was designed by Mahindra's Design Studio in Mumbai, with the product engineering being done at Mahindra Research Valley in Chennai. Hence, it carries some design elements from the Bolero. However, the boxy design of the Bolero was modified to create a swept back design to give the car an aerodynamic look. It is rumoured that one of the first prototypes of the TUV300 crashed into a tree branch that was lying low above a road, and the resultant bend in the pillars and roof inspired the designers to achieve the quirky design where the A, B and C Pillars are swept back to a high angle while the D Pillar remains vertical. This quirky design was not widely accepted, which led to mediocre sales of the TUV300 while its product predecessor Bolero still had consistently strong sales.

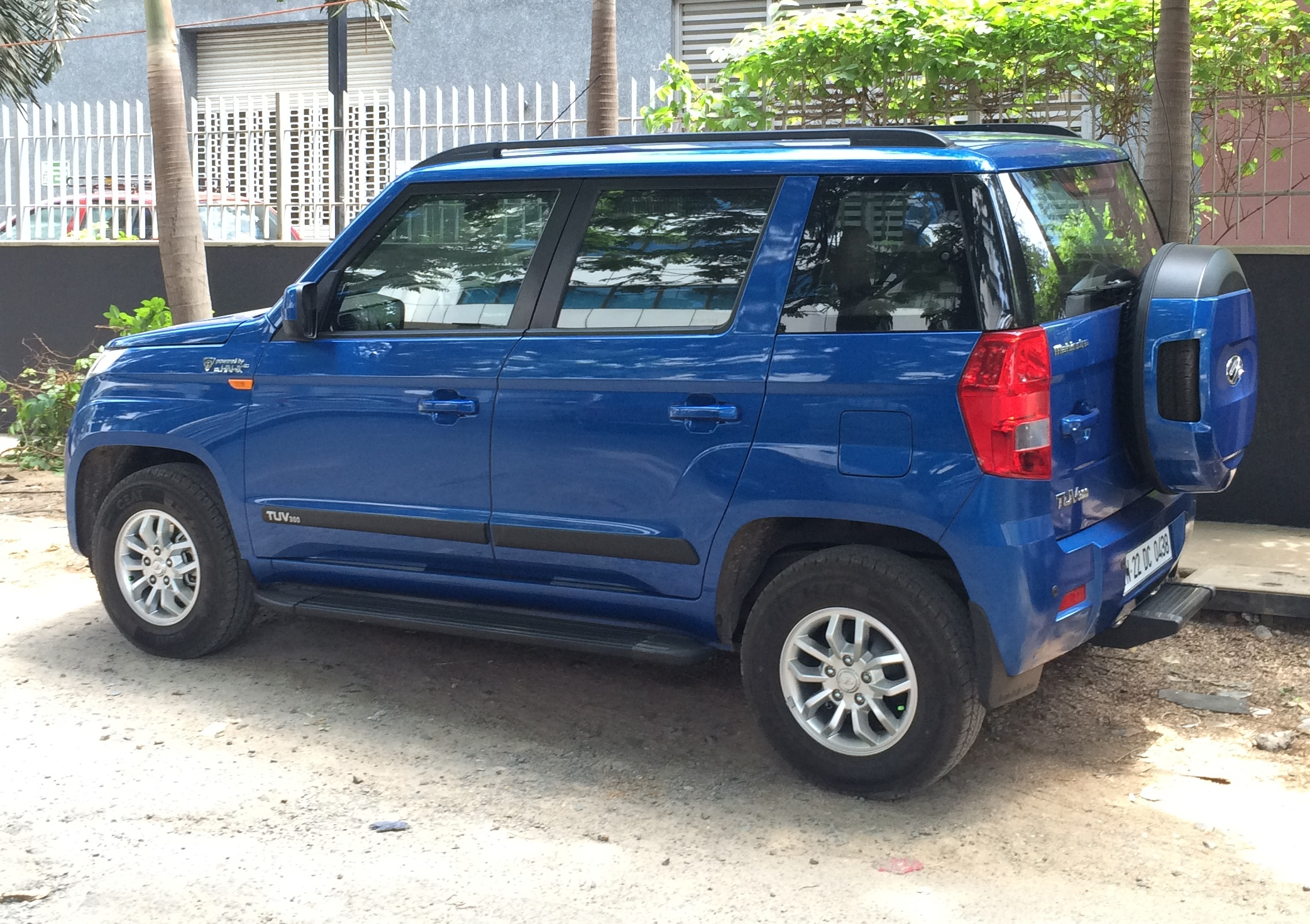
Rear view

== Variants ==
TUV300 was available in manual transmission and an automated manual transmission (AMT) known as Autoshift. There were in total seven trim levels available. Five trim levels use a manual transmission, while the last two uses an automated manual transmission. The manual transmission models have a power output of 85 PS (84 bhp; 63 kW) whereas the Autoshift models have a power output of 82 PS (81 bhp; 60 kW). The T10 and T8 models feature a power output of 101 PS (100 bhp; 74 kW). Later updated Bolero Neo is Available in Manual Transmission only. The Bolero Neo has 3 Variants N4, N8 and N10R and N10(O) with an optional pack.

== Bolero Neo Plus ==
On June 20, 2018, the TUV300 Plus was launched. It was an extended variant of the TUV300 with nine seats instead of seven, with the vehicle length stretched to 4,440 mm (175 in). It is powered by a larger 2.2-litre mHawk 120 engine that produces 122 PS (120 bhp; 90 kW), 21 PS up on the standard TUV300. On April 16, 2024, Mahindra relaunched TUV300 Plus as Bolero Neo Plus with certain upgrades such as a 9 inch infotainment system.

== 2025 facelift ==
The Mahindra Bolero Neo facelift was launched alongside the updated Mahindra Bolero on 6 October 2025. The compact ladder-frame SUV continues to use the 1.5-litre mHawk100 diesel engine, producing 100 PS (99 bhp; 74 kW) and 260 N⋅m (192 lb⋅ft) of torque, available with either a five-speed manual or six-speed automatic transmission.

The facelifted Neo is offered in five variants — N4, N6, N8, N10, and N10(O) — with prices ranging from ₹8.49 lakh to ₹11.99 lakh (ex-showroom, India).

Exterior changes include a new horizontal chrome-slatted grille, revised bumpers with silver skid inserts, 16-inch dark-grey alloy wheels, and additional colour options such as Jeans Blue and Concrete Grey, with dual-tone roof options available on select trims.

The interior now features a 9-inch touchscreen infotainment system with Android Auto and Apple CarPlay, a Sony six-speaker audio setup, and dual-tone interior themes in Mocha Brown or Lunar Grey. Other features include cruise control, Type-C USB ports, and leatherette upholstery. The Bolero Neo continues to offer side-facing third-row seats, maintaining a seven-seat configuration.

Standard safety features include dual airbags, ABS with EBD, corner braking control, rear parking sensors, and a reverse camera. Electronic stability control and additional airbags are not yet available.

== Safety ==
The Bolero Neo for India received 1 star for adult occupants and 1 star for toddlers from Global NCAP 2.0 in 2024 (similar to Latin NCAP 2016):

Global NCAP 2.0 test results (India) Mahindra Bolero Neo (2024, similar to Latin NCAP 2016)
Test	Score	Stars
Adult occupant protection	20.26/34.00	1 /5 stars
Child occupant protection	12.71/49.00	1 /5 stars

== See also ==
- Mahindra XUV700
- Mahindra XUV300
