= Mahindra NuvoSport =

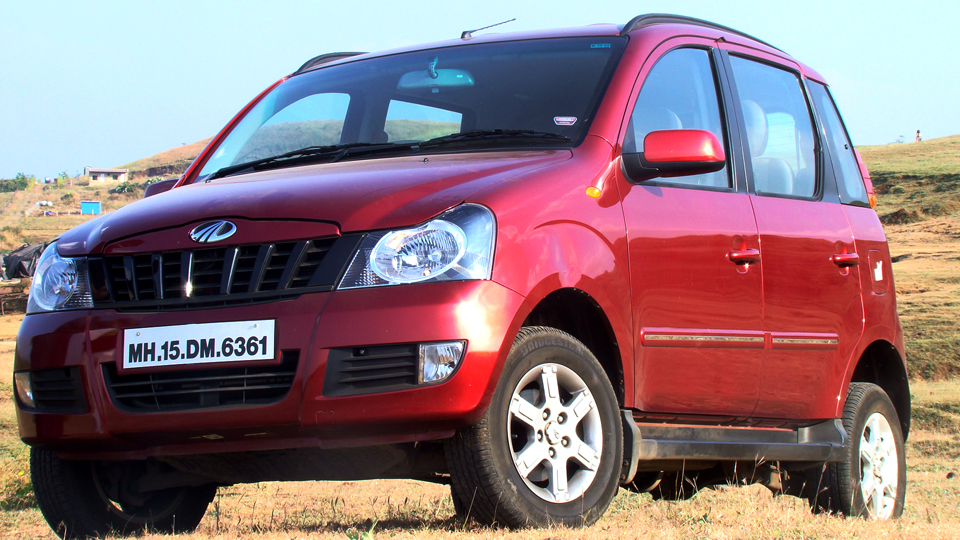

Overview
- Manufacturer: Mahindra & Mahindra Limited
- Also called: Mahindra Quanto (pre-facelift)
- Production: 2012–2020
- Model years: 2012–2016 (Quanto); 2016–2020 (NuvoSport)
- Assembly: Nasik, Maharashtra, India

Body and chassis
- Class: Mini SUV
- Body style: 5-door SUV
- Layout: Front-engine, rear-wheel drive Front-engine, four-wheel drive
- Related: Mahindra TUV300

Powertrain
- Engine: 1.5L mHawk I3 diesel 2.2L DW12 mHawk I4 diesel
- Transmission: 5-speed manual

Dimensions
- Wheelbase: 2,760 mm (108.7 in)
- Length: 3,985 mm (156.9 in)
- Width: 1,850 mm (72.8 in)
- Height: 1,880 mm (74.0 in)
- Curb weight: 1,640 kg (3,616 lb)

Chronology
- Successor: Mahindra TUV 300 (renamed to Bolero Neo since 2021)

The Mahindra Quanto was a 7-seater mini SUV designed and manufactured by the Indian automaker Mahindra & Mahindra. Since 2016, the facelifted version of the Quanto was marketed as the Mahindra NuvoSport.

== Specification ==
The Quanto is powered by a 1.5-litre mHawk three-cylinder 12-valve turbo diesel engine known as MCR100, and produces 98.6 bhp (74 kW; 100 PS) at 3,750 rpm and develops 240 N⋅m (177 lb⋅ft) of torque at 1,600–2,800 rpm. It accelerates from 0 to 100 kmh (62 mph) in 16–17 seconds.

The Quanto is offered in four trim levels: C2, C4, C6 and C8. All models share the same diesel engine. Since the release, 1,782 units were sold in September. In October, sales were exceeded to 2,497 units. At the end of November, 2,297 units were sold.

== Variants ==
VERSION		MILEAGE	PRICE
DIESEL	Quanto C2 1493 cc Manual	City: 15 kmpl Highway: 17 kmpl	Rs 6.48 lakhs Ex-showroom, Mumbai
DIESEL	Quanto C4 1493 cc Manual	City: 15 kmpl Highway: 17 kmpl	Rs 7.02 lakhs Ex-showroom, Mumbai
DIESEL	Quanto C6 1493 cc Manual	City: 15 kmpl Highway: 17 kmpl	Rs 7.48 lakhs Ex-showroom, Mumbai
DIESEL	Quanto C8 1493 cc Manual	City: 15 kmpl Highway: 17 kmpl	Rs 7.98 lakhs Ex-showroom, Mumbai

== NuvoSport (2016–2020) ==
The Mahindra NuvoSport is the continuation and facelifted version of the Quanto, it was launched on April 4, 2016. The NuvoSport features a much different exterior design than the Quanto, but the interior design remains unchanged, apart from the added interior features. It is still powered by the same 1.5-litre mHawk turbo diesel engine as the previous Quanto.

In 2020, the NuvoSport was discontinued due to slow sales and BS6 norms.
