= Mahindra Scorpio =

Mid-size sport utility vehicle

Mahindra Scorpio/Scorpio-N
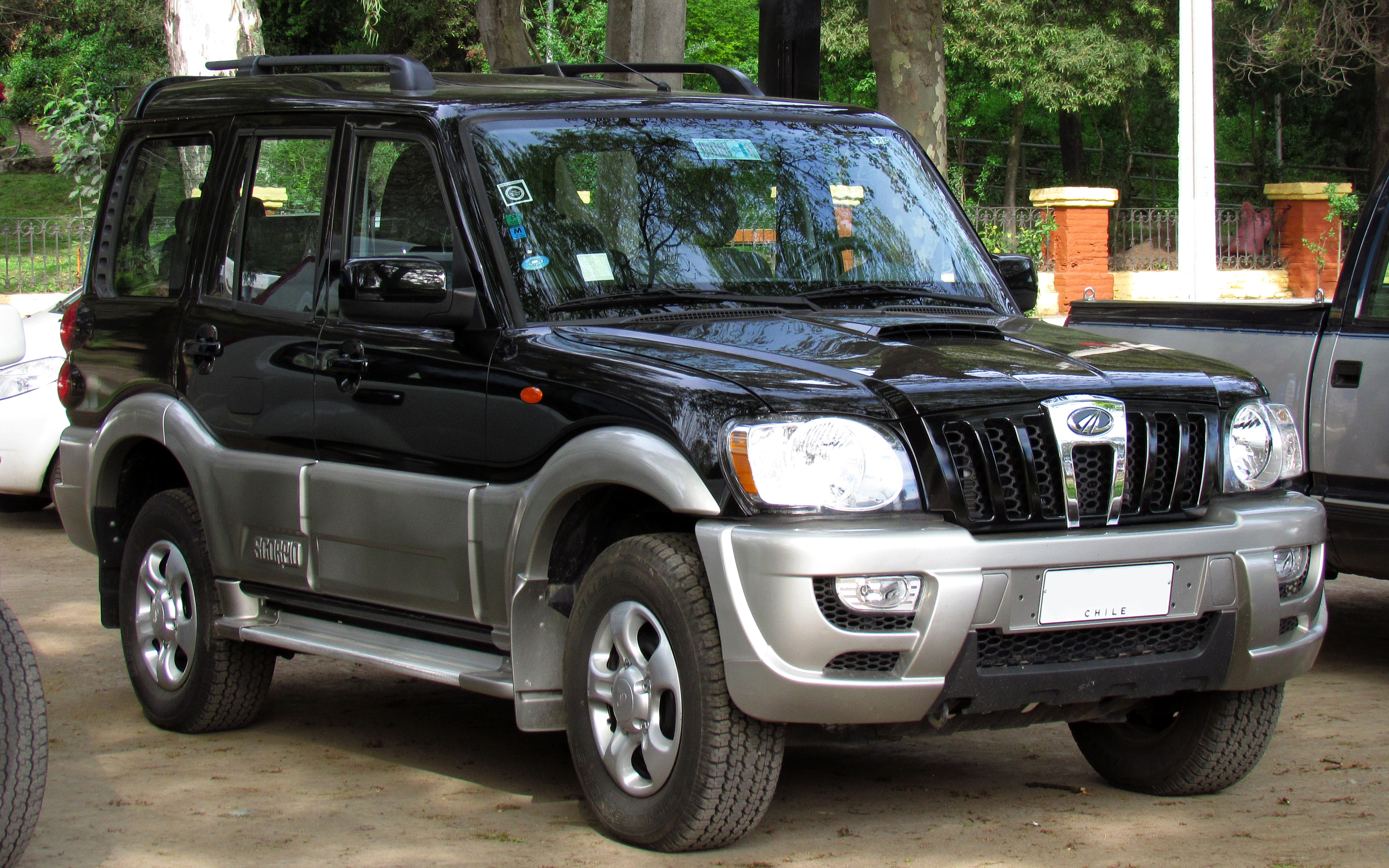
- Mahindra Scorpio GLX

Overview
- Manufacturer: Mahindra & Mahindra Limited
- Also called: Mahindra Goa
- Production: June 2002 – present

Body and chassis
- Class: Mid-size SUV (India); Compact SUV (global)
- Body style: 5-door SUV
- Layout: Front-engine, rear-wheel-drive; Front-engine, four-wheel-drive
- Chassis: Body-on-frame
- Related: Mahindra Scorpio Getaway; Mahindra Bolero; Mahindra Xylo; Mahindra Bolero Neo

The Mahindra Scorpio is a mid-size SUV (in the Indian market) and compact SUV (in the Global market) manufactured by the Indian automaker Mahindra & Mahindra since 2002. It was Mahindra's first model to be built for the global market.

The Scorpio was conceptualized and designed by the in-house integrated design and manufacturing team of Mahindra & Mahindra. The car has been the recipient of three Indian awards, including the "Car of the Year" award from Business Standard Motoring as well as the "Best SUV of the Year" and the "Best Car of the Year" awards, both from BBC World's Wheels.

== Development ==
Prior to the mid-1990s, Mahindra & Mahindra was an automobile assembly company. The company manufactured Willys Jeeps and its minor modified versions, with modifications carried out in India. In 1996, the company planned to enter the SUV segment with a new product that could compete globally. Since M&M did not have the technical know-how to handle such an ambitious product, they devised an entirely new concept among Indian auto companies. They hired new executives who had worked in the auto industry in Western countries, such as Pawan Goenka and Alan Durante.

The new Mahindra Scorpio SUV had all of its major systems designed directly by suppliers, with the only inputs from Mahindra being design, performance specifications and program cost. The design and engineering of the systems were carried out by suppliers, as well as testing, validation, and materials selection. Sourcing and engineering locations were also chosen by suppliers. The parts were later assembled in a Mahindra plant under the Mahindra badge, being a well-known brand in India. Using this method, the company was able to build from scratch a new vehicle with virtually 100 percent supplier involvement from concept to reality, at a cost of Rs 600 crore ($120 million), including improvements to the plant. The project took five years to move from concept to final product. The cost was estimated in 2002 to be Rs 550 crore.

== First generation (2002) ==
First generation
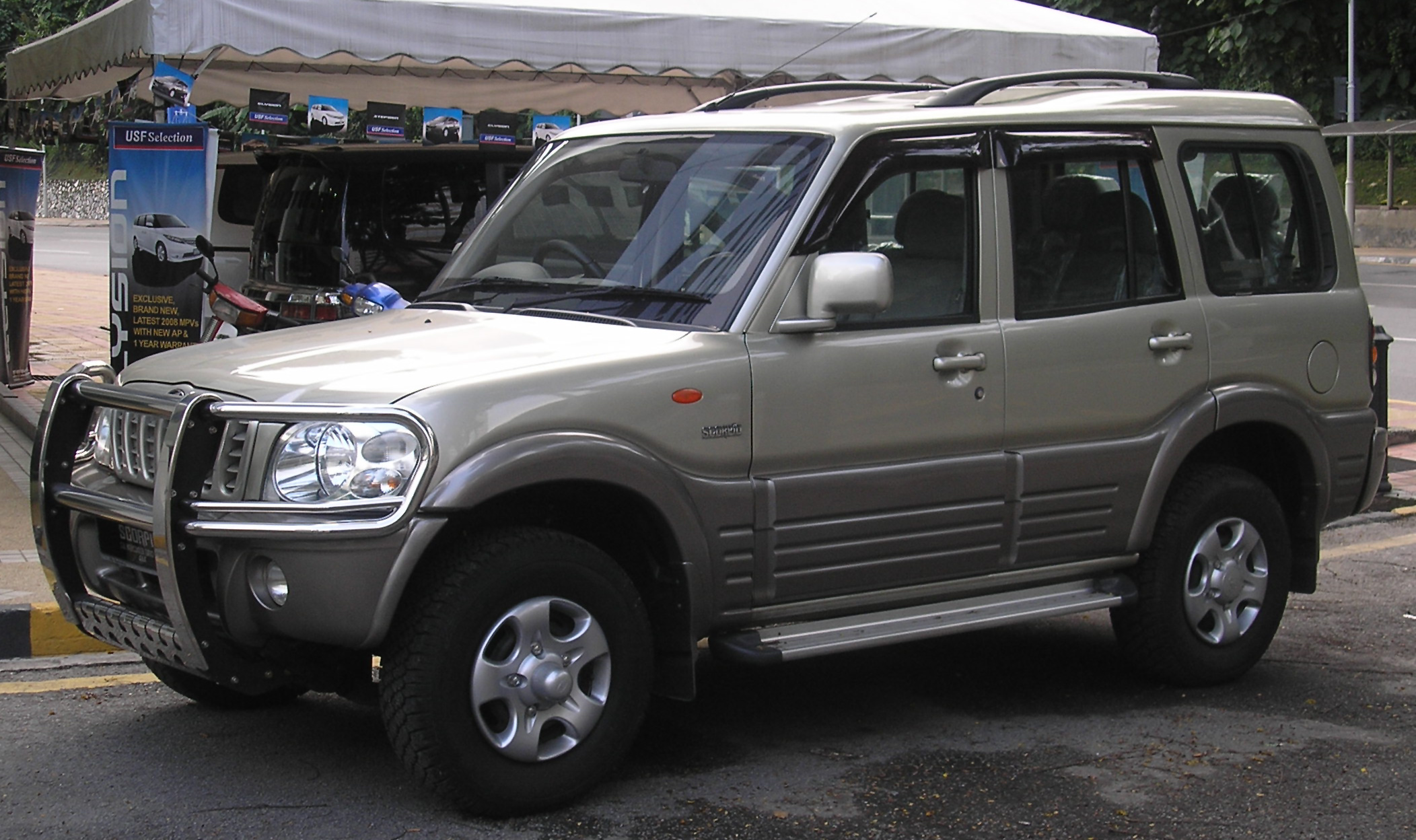

Overview
- Also called: Mahindra Goa
- Production: June 2002 – present
- Assembly: Maharashtra, India; BAG, Egypt; Nordex, Montevideo, Uruguay
- Designer: Ramkripa Ananthan (Scorpio Classic)

Powertrain
- Engine: Petrol: 2.0 L Renault F4R I4; 2.2 L mHawk turbo I4; Diesel: 2.2 L mHawk I4; 2.5 L NEF TCI turbo I4 (export); 2.5 L NEF CRDe common rail I4 (export); 2.6 L NEF TC turbo I4; 2.6 L NEF CRDe common rail I4
- Transmission: 5/6-speed manual; 6-speed automatic DSI

Dimensions
- Wheelbase: 105.5 in (2,680 mm)
- Length: 176.9 in (4,493 mm)
- Width: 71.5 in (1,816 mm)
- Height: 77.8 in (1,976 mm)
- Curb weight: 4,012 lb (1,820 kg) (2WD); 4,230 lb (1,920 kg) (4WD)

=== Pre-facelift (Project Scorpio; 2002–2006) ===
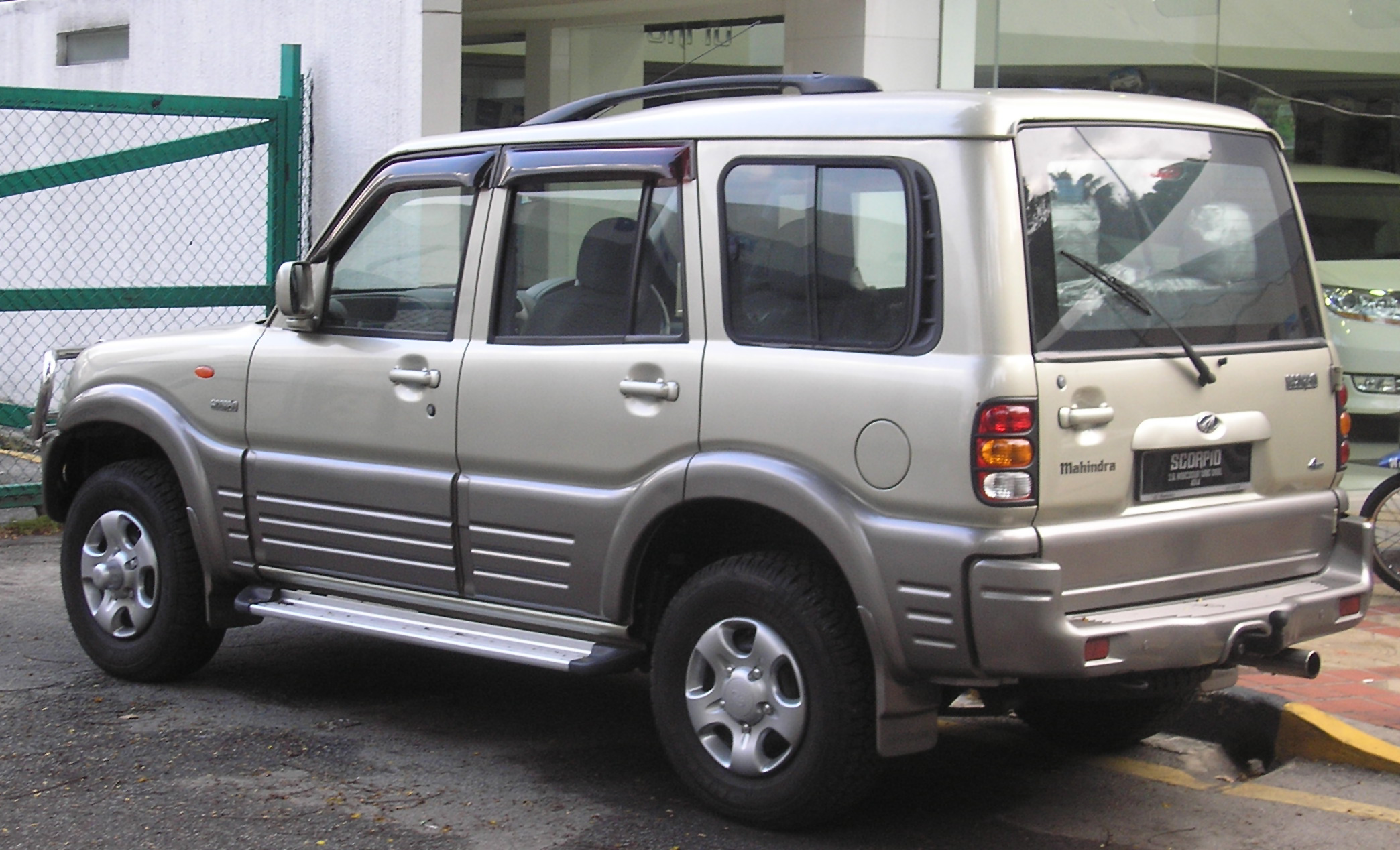
Mahindra Scorpio pre-facelift (rear)

The Mahindra Scorpio was first launched in India on 20 June 2002. Soon after its success, the Mahindra Scorpio later received a minor update to include plush seats, rear center armrest, dual-tone exterior color, and various minor changes. The direct injection turbo-diesel engine was all new; the NEF (New Engine Family) is square, with a 94.0 mm (3.70 in) bore and stroke, displaces 2,609 cc (2.6 L), and produces 109 hp (81 kW) at 3,800 rpm. To meet the upcoming Bharat 3 emissions standards in 2005, Mahindra enlisted the help of AVL in Austria to convert the NEF engine to common rail injection, which also increased power to 115 hp (86 kW) at the same engine speed. This engine family is also known as the 2.6 SZ.

In addition to the in-house diesel engine, the Scorpio (and Goa) was also offered with Renault's 2-liter F4R petrol engine, producing 116 hp (87 kW) at 5,500 rpm. Customers preferred the torquier diesel options for the heavy Scorpio and sales of the petrol-engined model were always modest.

The vehicle was sold in Europe as the Mahindra Goa with first sales in Italy in 2003. As many export markets, particularly in Europe, have a significant tax threshold at 2.5 litres, a short stroke version of the NEF displacing 2,498 cc (2.5 L) was made available in 2004. Power was down marginally, at 105 hp (78 kW) for the NEF 2.5 TCI and 112 hp (84 kW) for the NEF 2.5 CRDe. In 2006, Mahindra announced that Scorpios sold in Russia will be made as kits with a joint venture partner.

=== First facelift (2006–2009) ===
In April 2006, Mahindra launched the first facelift of the Scorpio, marketed as the All-New Scorpio. At the Auto Expo 2006 in Delhi, Mahindra also showcased their future plans on the Scorpio model by showcasing a hybrid Scorpio with a CRDe engine and a Scorpio pickup truck derivative. The hybrid, the first such vehicle developed in India, was developed by Arun Juara, a former employee of Ford. His senior, Pawan Goenka, a former engineer at GM, heads Mahindra's automotive division and oversees the Scorpio project. A pickup truck version of the Scorpio was launched in India in June 2007, known as the Scorpio Getaway. On 21 September 2008, the Scorpio was updated with a 6-speed automatic transmission.

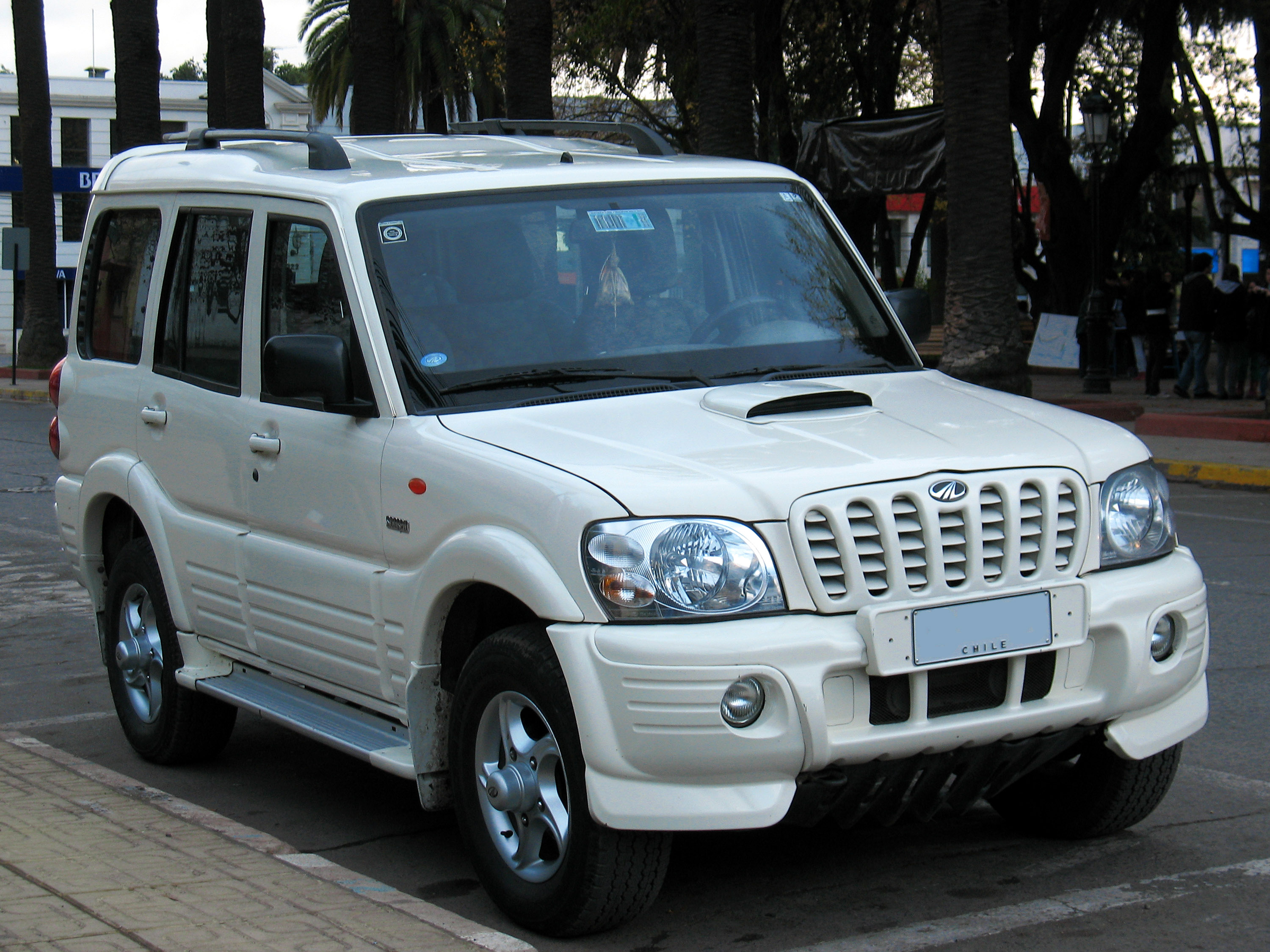
Mahindra Scorpio 1st facelift (front)

=== Second facelift (2009–2014) ===
The second facelift of the Mahindra Scorpio was largely cosmetic, with key changes including the headlight housings, bonnet and bumper designs. There were also minor increases in power and torque.

On 14 April 2009, Mahindra revealed a concept of a diesel-electric hybrid version of their Scorpio SUV at the 2008 SAE World Congress.

The Mahindra Scorpio Getaway was launched in Australia in mid-2009, marketed there as the Mahindra Pik-Up. It received additional safety features compared to the Indian model, such as ABS brakes and airbags in an attempt to raise its rating to a minimum of 3 stars from the current 2 star ANCAP rating. The 2012 model scored 6.6 points out of a possible 16, giving it a 3-star ANCAP rating.

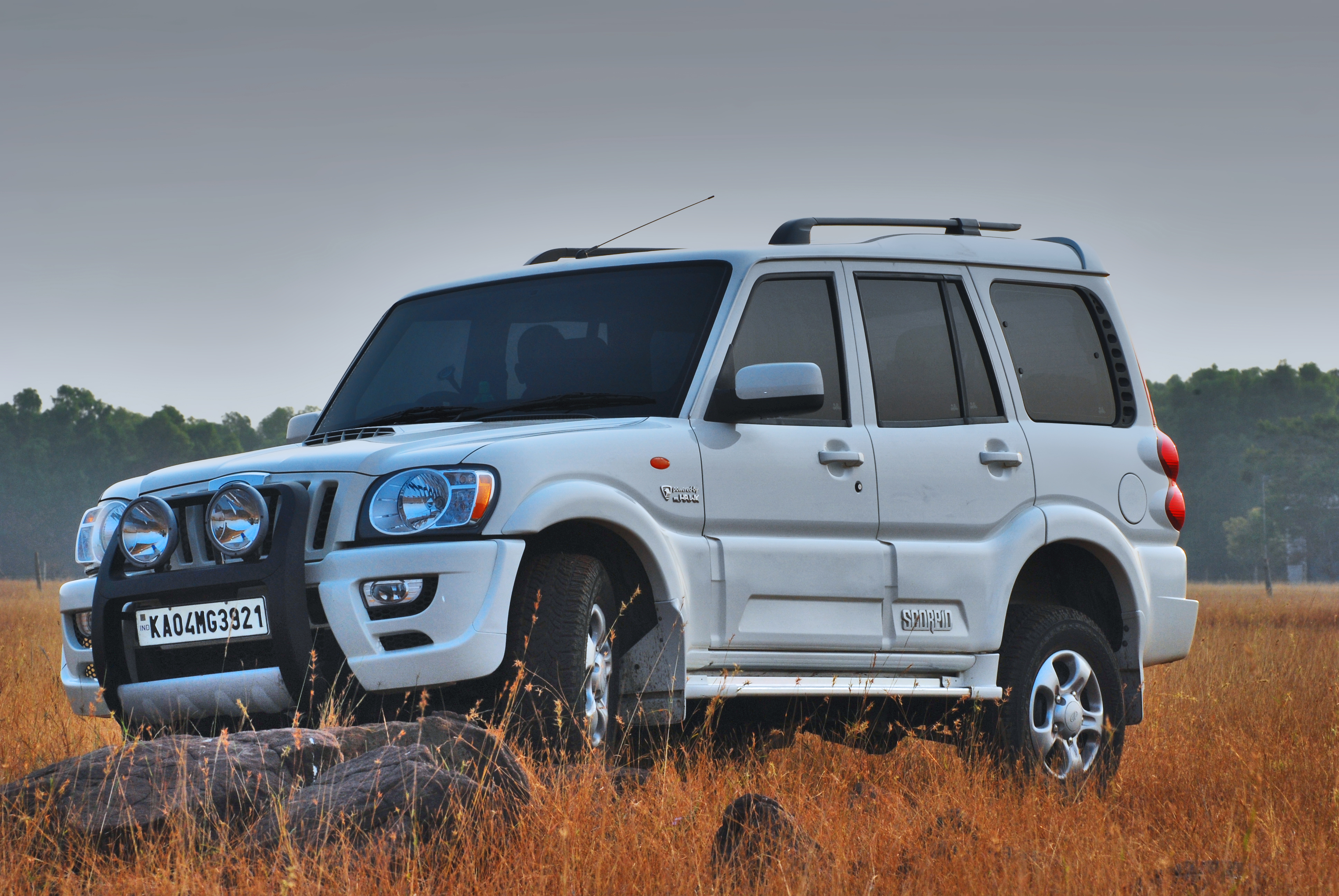
Mahindra Scorpio, 2nd facelift (front)

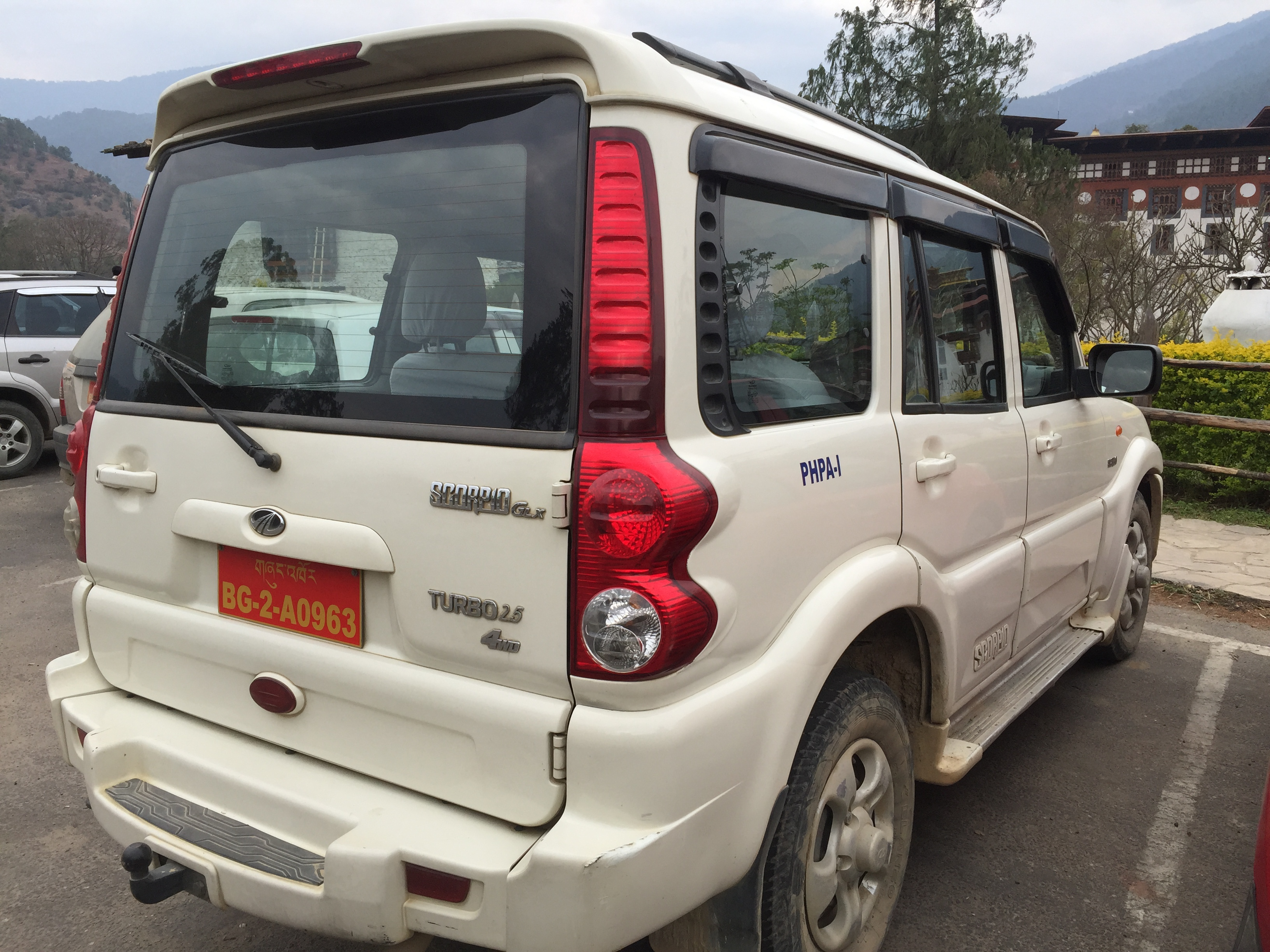
Mahindra Scorpio, 2nd facelift (rear)

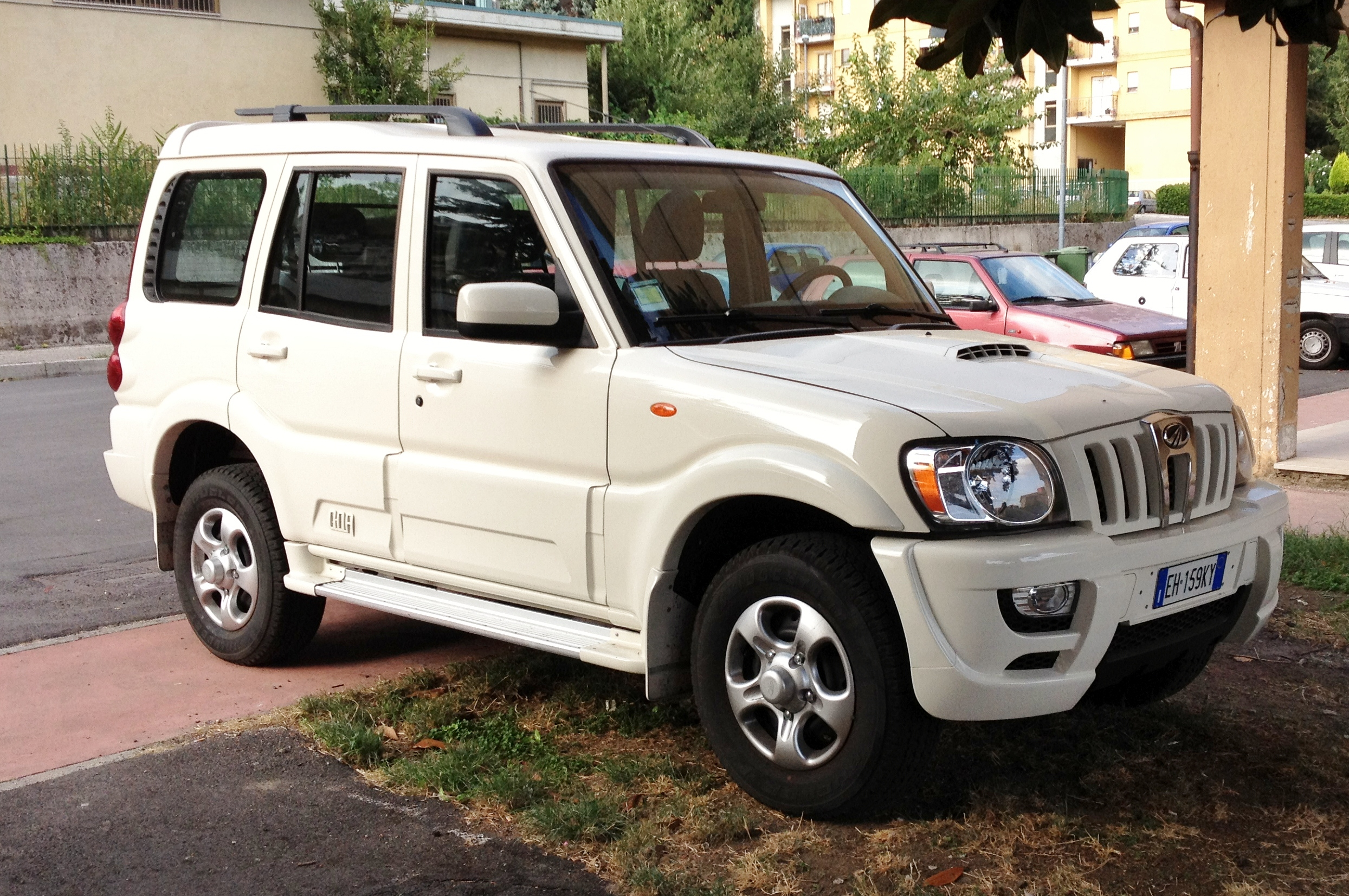
Mahindra Goa (export model of Scorpio; front)

=== Third facelift (W105; 2014–2022) ===
The Mahindra Scorpio received its facelift on 25 September 2014, featuring a redesigned front and rear fascias and a new dashboard. A revised automatic variant of the Scorpio was launched in 2015 and automatic transmission was discontinued in 2018 due to the launch of the Scorpio S11.

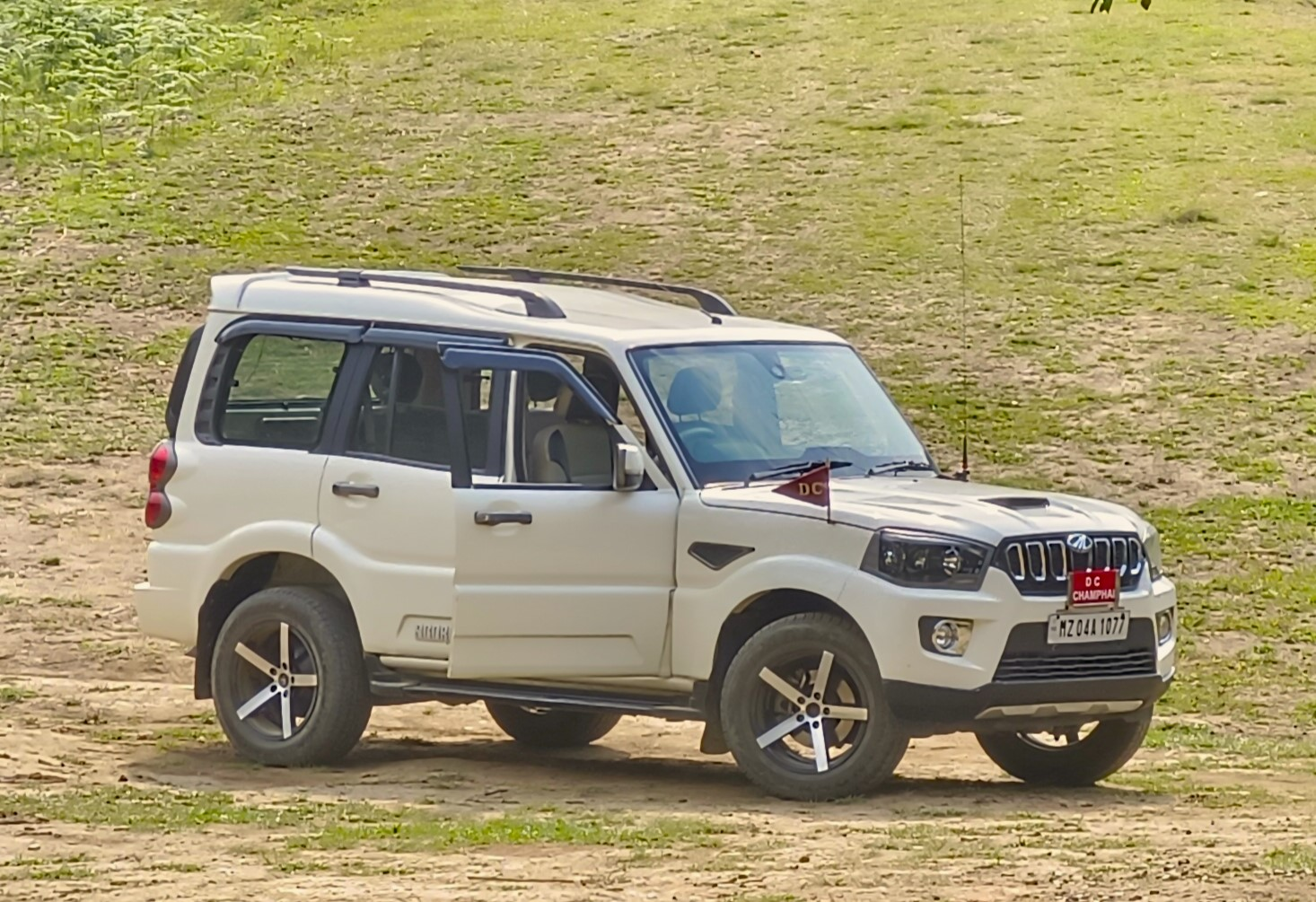
Mahindra Scorpio S11 (Scorpio Classic; W110)

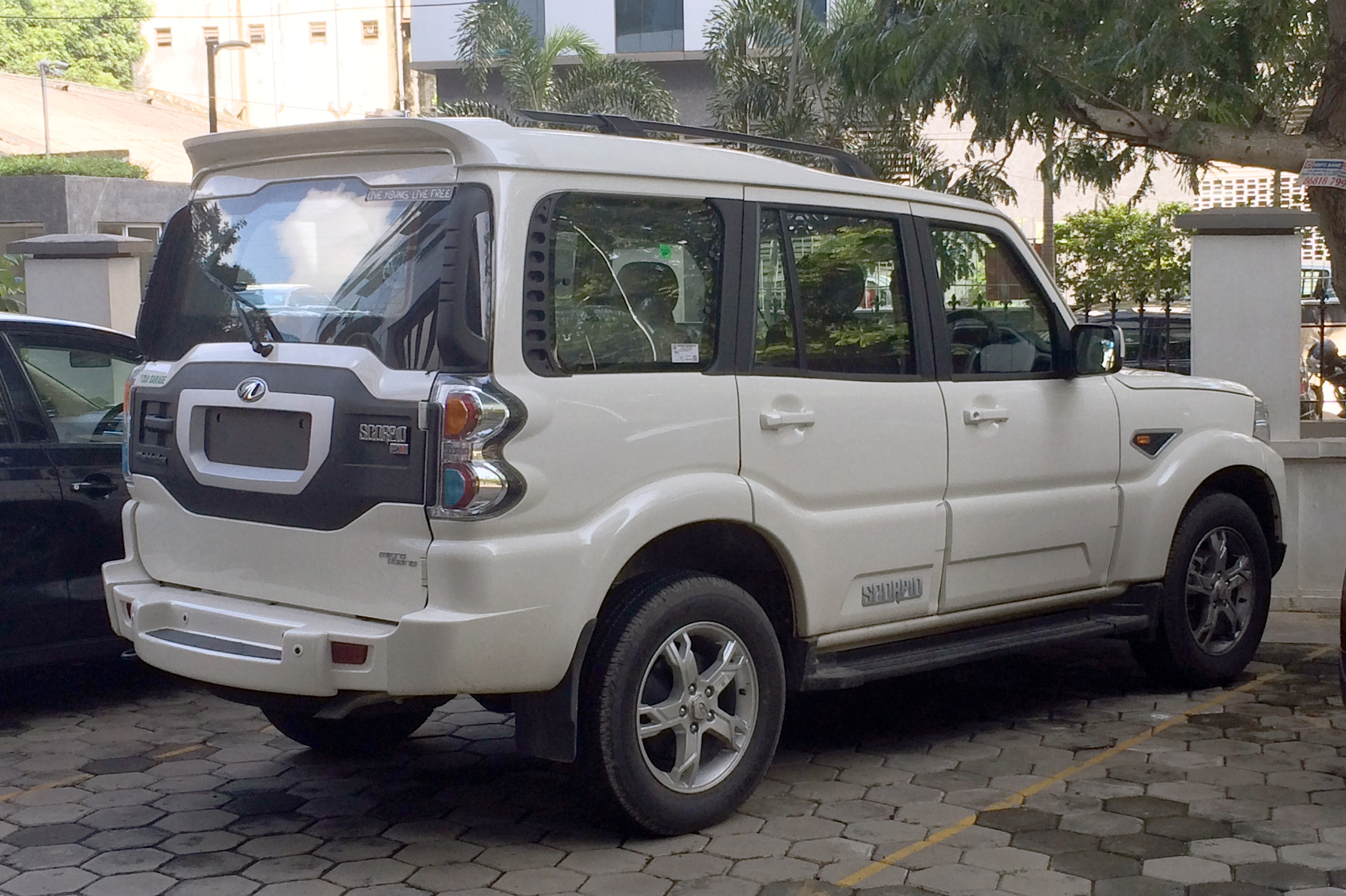
Mahindra Scorpio 3rd facelift (rear) (S10)

=== Mahindra Scorpio Classic (W110; 2022–present) ===
The current generation Scorpio will continue to be sold as the "Scorpio Classic" in two variants, called Scorpio S and Scorpio S11. Mahindra launched the Scorpio Classic in India on 19 August 2022. The new Mahindra "Twin Peaks" logo, reserved for Sport Utility Vehicles, replaces the old logo.

=== Safety ===
The Scorpio for India with no airbags and no ABS received 0 stars for adult occupants and 2 stars for toddlers from Global NCAP 1.0 in 2016 (similar to Latin NCAP 2013).

Global NCAP 1.0 test results (India) Mahindra Scorpio – No Airbags (2016, similar to Latin NCAP 2013)
Test	Score	Stars
Adult occupant protection	0.00/17.00	0 /5 stars
Child occupant protection	16.73/49.00	2 /5 stars

== Second generation (Z101; 2022) ==
Mahindra Scorpio-N
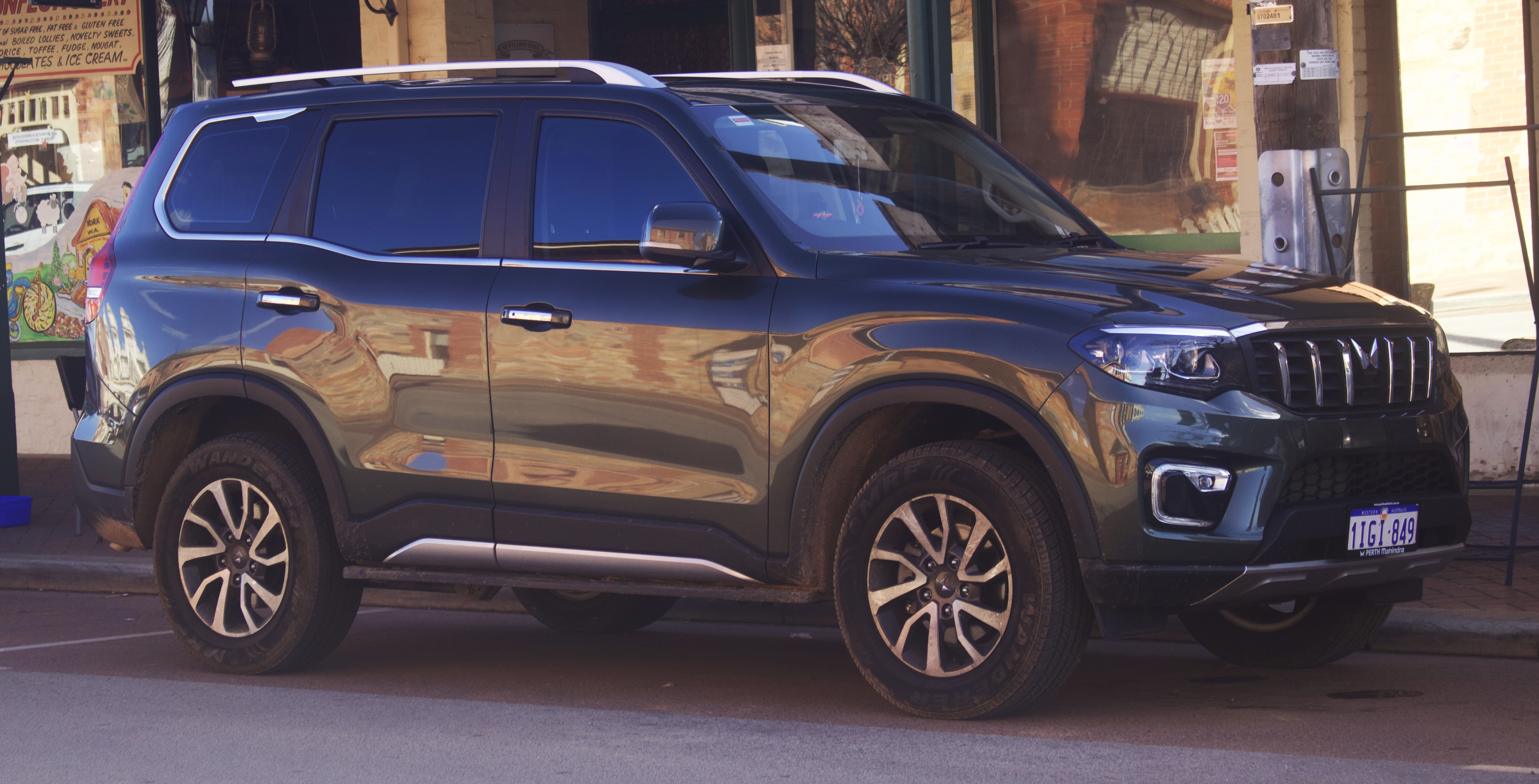
- 2024 Mahindra Scorpio-N Z8L

Overview
- Model code: Z101
- Production: 2022–present
- Assembly: India: Chakan, Maharashtra
- Designer: Pratap Bose

Body and chassis
- Layout: Front-engine, rear-wheel-drive 4WD
- Platform: Mahindra third-generation ladder-frame platform
- Related: Mahindra Thar; Mahindra XUV700

Powertrain
- Engine: Petrol: 2.0 L mStallion turbocharged I4; Diesel: 2.2 L mHawk turbocharged I4
- Transmission: 6-speed manual 6-speed automatic

Dimensions
- Wheelbase: 2,750 mm (108.3 in)
- Length: 4,662 mm (183.5 in)
- Width: 1,917 mm (75.5 in)
- Height: 1,857 mm (73.1 in)

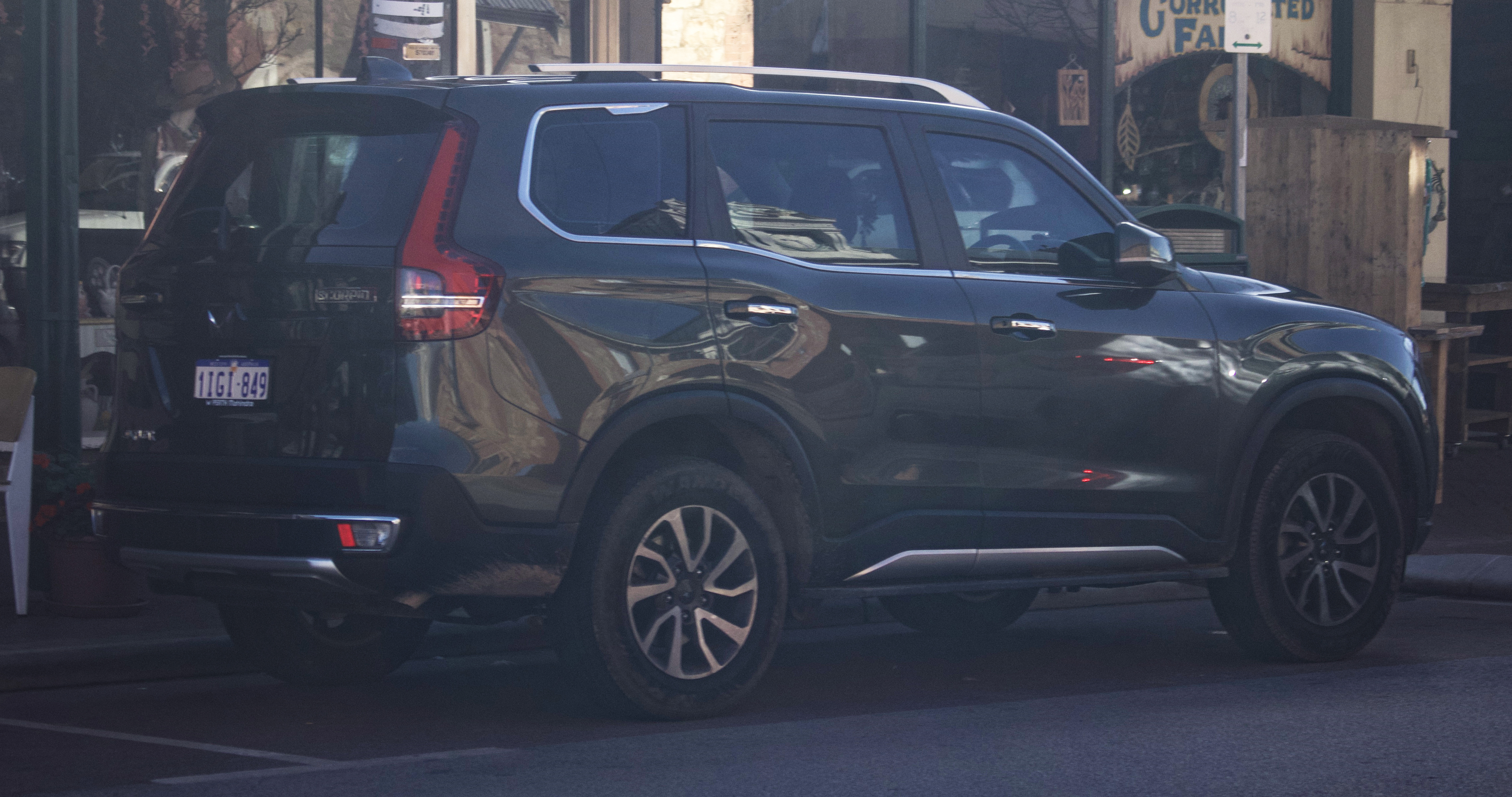
Rear view

The second-generation Mahindra Scorpio was revealed in May 2022 and launched in India on 27 June 2022 as the Mahindra Scorpio-N. Internally developed under the project code Z101, it is a completely new model built on Mahindra’s third-generation ladder-frame platform, with no carryover components from the original Scorpio.

The previous-generation Scorpio remained on sale alongside the new model and was renamed the Mahindra Scorpio Classic. The Scorpio-N is positioned above the Classic and is sold as a more premium, modern mid-size SUV.

=== Design ===
The Scorpio-N uses a more upright, imposing design language than its predecessor. It features twin-pod LED projector headlamps, a large vertical grille, LED daytime running lights, squared wheel arches, roof rails, and a tailgate-mounted spare-wheel-style design element. The front fascia carries Mahindra’s then-new logo.

The interior received a substantial redesign, with a new dashboard layout, a central touchscreen infotainment system, digital instrumentation on higher variants, a two-spoke steering wheel, and a more premium cabin than the first-generation Scorpio.

=== Powertrain ===
The Scorpio-N is available with petrol and diesel engines. The petrol option is a 2.0-litre turbocharged mStallion four-cylinder engine producing 200 PS (147 kW; 197 hp) and 380 N⋅m (280 lb⋅ft) of torque. The diesel option is a 2.2-litre turbocharged mHawk four-cylinder engine producing up to 175 PS (129 kW; 173 hp) and 400 N⋅m (295 lb⋅ft) of torque.

Transmission choices include a six-speed manual gearbox and a six-speed automatic gearbox. Rear-wheel drive is standard, while four-wheel drive is offered with the diesel engine.

=== Features ===
Higher variants of the Scorpio-N include features such as a large touchscreen infotainment system with wireless smartphone connectivity, connected-car technology, a panoramic sunroof, dual-zone automatic climate control, wireless charging, cruise control, drive modes, and multiple airbags. Safety equipment includes electronic stability control, hill-hold control, hill-descent control, and ABS with EBD.

=== Variants ===
The Scorpio-N is offered in multiple trim levels, including Z2, Z4, Z6, Z8, and Z8L. These variants differ in equipment, drivetrain, seating configuration, and powertrain availability. It is offered in both six- and seven-seat layouts, depending on the variant.

=== Markets ===
The Scorpio-N was also launched in Australasia alongside the XUV700 in 2023. Mahindra also intended to launch the Scorpio-N in North America and the Middle East along with the XUV700 in 2024, with other electric models in 2027.

=== 2026 facelift ===
Mahindra launched a facelifted Scorpio-N in India on 5 August 2026. The exterior was largely unchanged, with new 18-inch diamond-cut alloy wheels on the Z8T and Z8L variants.

The interior received a revised dashboard with a 12.3-inch touchscreen, 10.25-inch digital instrument cluster, panoramic sunroof on the Z8L, 540-degree surround-view camera, blind-view monitor, and 65W USB Type-C front charging port. Powertrains and transmissions were carried over from the pre-facelift model.

Prices at launch ranged from ₹13.69 lakh to ₹25.49 lakh (ex-showroom, India), with Z2, Z4, Z6, Z8S, Z8, Z8T, and Z8L variants.

=== Mahindra Scorpio N's reliability issues ===
A video of Mahindra Scorpio-N went viral in March 2023, in which the owner of the SUV took the car under a waterfall and water started entering his Scorpio N from the sunroof. This resulted in a social media debate.

=== Safety ===
==== Global NCAP ====
The Mahindra Scorpio-N was rated five stars in adult safety and three stars in child safety by the Global NCAP under its new protocol in H2 2022 (similar to Latin NCAP 2016).

Global NCAP 2.0 test results (India) Mahindra Scorpio-N (*) (H2 2022, similar to Latin NCAP 2016)
Test	Score	Stars
Adult occupant protection	29.25/34.00	5 /5 stars
Child occupant protection	28.93/49.00	3 /5 stars

==== ANCAP ====
ANCAP (aligned with Euro NCAP) rated the Australasian-market Scorpio zero stars in 2023 due to the lack of ADAS.

ANCAP test results Mahindra Scorpio all variants (2023, aligned with Euro NCAP)
Test	Points	%
Overall:	0 /5 stars	
Adult occupant:	17.67	44%
Child occupant:	39.27	80%
Pedestrian:	14.94	23%
Safety assist:	0	0%

== See also ==
- Mahindra Scorpio Getaway the pickup truck version
