= Mahindra Bolero =

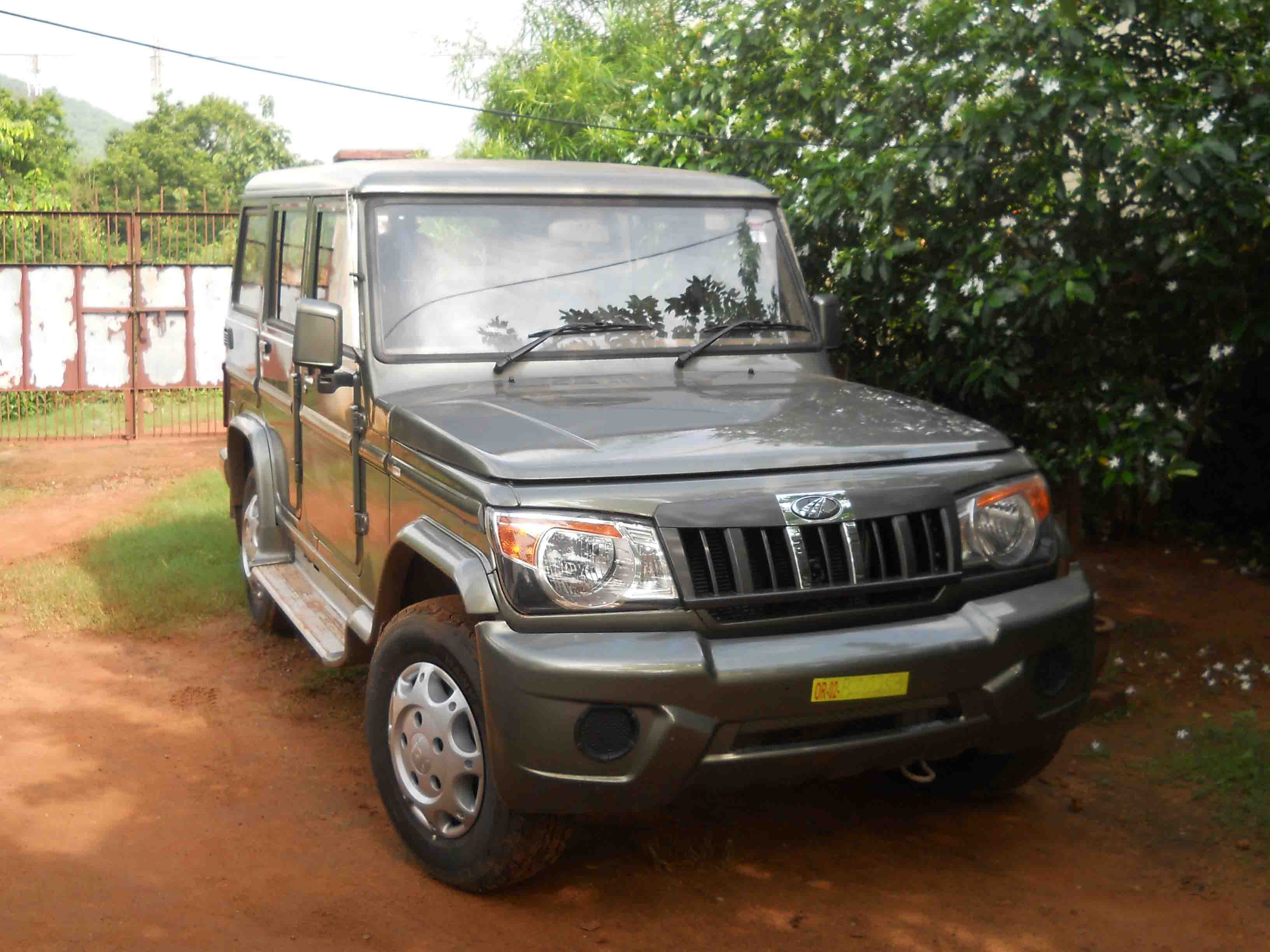

Overview
- Manufacturer: Mahindra and Mahindra Limited
- Also called: Mahindra Cimarrón (South America); Mahindra Enforcer (Philippines)
- Production: 2000–present
- Assembly: Nashik, Maharashtra, India; Haridwar, Uttarakhand, India; Montevideo, Uruguay (Nordex S.A.)
- Designer: Shyam Kumar Alepalli- Styling, Dilip Bogawat / Sanjay Shrivastava & Ulhas Khupse -Design Raju Rasal - Proto

Body and chassis
- Class: Mid-size SUV; Subcompact SUV (According to the length)
- Body style: 5 door SUV
- Layout: Front-engine, rear-wheel-drive Front-engine, four-wheel-drive
- Related: Mahindra Scorpio,Mahindra Xylo, Mahindra Armada

Powertrain
- Engine: 1493 cc mHawkD70 turbodiesel I3; 2498 cc XD3P diesel I4; 2523 cc MDI turbodiesel I4; 2523 cc M2DiCR turbodiesel I4
- Transmission: 5-speed Manual

Dimensions
- Wheelbase: 2,680 mm (105.5 in); Camper: 3,014 mm (118.7 in)
- Length: 3,995 mm (157.3 in); Camper: 4,824 mm (189.9 in)
- Width: 1,745 mm (68.7 in); Camper: 1,670 mm (65.7 in)
- Height: 1,885 mm (74.2 in)

Chronology
- Predecessor: Mahindra Armada

The Mahindra Bolero is an SUV produced by Mahindra & Mahindra since 2000.

== History and Design ==
The basic design is based on the Mahindra Armada Grand. The first-generation Bolero was equipped with a Peugeot 2.5 L (150 in^{3}) IDI engine which produced 76 PS (56 kW), although turbocharged versions with or without an intercooler were also available, raising power to 101 or 95 PS (74 or 70 kW) respectively. The second generation was released with slightly modified exteriors (a larger grille being the most obvious change) and the major change was the engine, a 2.5 L (150 in^{3}) in-house turbocharged direct injection diesel engine from Mahindra with an output of 72 PS (53 kW).

In September 2011, the third generation Bolero was released, with a more thoroughly re-designed front with jewelled headlamps. In India it is powered by the 63 PS (46 kW) M2DiCR diesel engine with a "soft turbo", mated to a five-speed transmission. This latest engine meets the Bharat IV emissions standards.

On 6 October 2025, a facelift was unveiled alongside the Bolero Neo, featuring a redesigned grille, new fog lights, new color and new alloys.

== Models and trims ==
Bolero is available in 3 variants B4, B6 and B6 optional since April 2020. An ambulance model is also available. The five-seat pickup version of the Bolero (nowadays known as the Bolero Camper) entered production in Uruguay as the "Cimarrón" in June 2004.

=== 2025 facelift ===
On 6 October 2025, Mahindra & Mahindra introduced the facelifted version of the Mahindra Bolero in India. The update retains the existing 1.5-litre mHawk75 three-cylinder diesel engine, producing 75 PS (55 kW) and 210 N⋅m (155 lb⋅ft) of torque, paired with a five-speed manual gearbox and rear-wheel-drive layout.

The 2025 model is available in four variants — B4, B6, B6(O), and a new B8 — with prices ranging between ₹7.99 lakh and ₹9.69 lakh (ex-showroom, India).

Key exterior revisions include a five-slat chrome grille featuring Mahindra’s twin-peaks logo, redesigned body-coloured bumpers with rectangular fog lamps on higher trims, and new 15-inch diamond-cut alloy wheels on the B8 variant. A new Stealth Black paint option has been added alongside Diamond White, DSAT Silver, and Rocky Beige.

Inside, the Bolero gains a 7-inch touchscreen infotainment system with Bluetooth connectivity, leatherette upholstery, Type-C charging ports, and steering-mounted audio controls. The model also receives RideFlo frequency-sensitive dampers, replacing the previous rear suspension setup — a change noted by Mahindra as aimed at improving comfort and stability.

Standard safety equipment includes dual airbags, ABS with EBD, rear parking sensors, tyre pressure monitoring system (TPMS), and ISOFIX child-seat mounts. The model continues to be offered without side or curtain airbags.

== Bolero Camper ==
The Mahindra Bolero is an SUV-based pickup truck, available in AC and non-AC variants. Single or double cabin models are on offer. It was originally sold as the Bolero Single Cab or Bolero Double Cab, but from early 2002 the Double Cab model has been marketed as the Bolero Camper in India. It is powered by the 72 PS (53 kW) 2523 cc turbo-charged direct injection diesel engine, although the new, cleaner M2DiCR has also been an option and in earlier years Peugeot engines were also fitted. Drive is manual with 4WD optional, power steering is available. Default tyres are 235/75 R15 Goodyear Wrangler radials. Mileage 12.2 km/L (8.2 L/100 km; 29 mpg_{‑US}) fuel economy in city with AC. Mileage 14 km/L (7.1 L/100 km; 33 mpg_{‑US}) fuel economy on highway at around 80 to 100 km/h with AC.

There is also a five-seat pickup version with a shorter cargo area called the Bolero Commando, as well as 7/8-seater soft top model called the Bolero Invader.

== Bolero Pik-Up ==
The Mahindra Bolero Pik-Up is a single cab mid-size pickup truck with solid front and rear axles. Leaf spring suspension (9 leaves) at all four wheels, 2523cc engine 76 PS (56 kW) at 3200 rpm, 200 N⋅m (148 lb⋅ft) at 1400-2200rpm, 5-speed manual transmission. 700R15 12PR tyres, front disk and rear drum brakes. Length 5,215 mm (205 in), width 1,700 mm (67 in), height 1,865 mm (73 in), wheelbase 3,260 mm (128 in), payload 1,700 kg (3,748 lb).

== Bolero Neo ==
The Mahindra Bolero Neo is a 5-7 seater SUV fitted with a mHAWK 100 engine and MTT (Multi terrain technology). It uses a 3rd Generation Scorpio chassis which is useful for off-road driving and has a body with ladder-on-frame construction.

== Sales ==
The model has sold over 1.4 million units (since 2000) by 2023 April.
