= Mahindra XEV 9S =

Battery electric compact crossover SUV

Overview
- Manufacturer: Mahindra & Mahindra
- Also called: Mahindra XUV700 (ICE; pre-facelift); Mahindra XUV 7XO (ICE; facelift)
- Production: December 2025 − present
- Assembly: India: Chakan, Maharashtra

Body and chassis
- Class: Compact crossover SUV
- Body style: 5-door SUV
- Layout: Rear-motor, rear-wheel drive
- Platform: INGLO
- Related: Mahindra BE 6; Mahindra XEV 9e

Powertrain
- Power output: 231–286 PS (170–210 kW; 228–282 hp)
- Battery: 59 kWh LFP FEV/FinDreams; 70 kWh LFP FEV/FinDreams; 79 kWh LFP FEV/FinDreams
- Electric range: 521–679 km (324–422 mi) (MIDC)
- Plug-in charging: DC: 140–180 kW

Dimensions
- Wheelbase: 2,762 mm (108.7 in)
- Length: 4,737 mm (186.5 in)
- Width: 1,900 mm (74.8 in)
- Height: 1,747 mm (68.8 in)

The Mahindra XEV 9S is a battery-electric compact crossover SUV produced by the Indian automobile manufacturer Mahindra & Mahindra. Its combustion engine variant is called the Mahindra XUV 7XO, a facelifted version of the Mahindra XUV700.

== Overview ==
The model was introduced on 27 November 2025 and began deliveries on 23 January 2026.

The XEV 9S showcases Mahindra's electric design language through a shut-off grille, L-shaped LED DRLs, vertically stacked projector headlamps, a full-width LED light bar, and gloss-black bumpers for an aerodynamic SUV stance. Its dimensions include 4,737 mm (186.5 in) length, 1,900 mm (74.8 in) width, 1,747 mm (68.8 in) height, and a 2,762 mm (108.7 in) wheelbase, with 205 mm (8.1 in) ground clearance (up to 222 mm (8.7 in) at the battery).

A tech-rich cabin highlights a triple 12.3-inch screen setup (driver display, infotainment, and passenger screen) powered by a Snapdragon 8155 processor and MAIA software. Higher variants add luxury touches like cooled seats across rows, a panoramic sunroof, a Snapdragon 8295 processor, an augmented-reality heads-up display, dual wireless charging, 65 W USB-C ports, multi-colour ambient lighting, and a 16-speaker Harman Kardon audio system with Dolby Atmos.

=== Key features ===
- Dual-zone climate control, ventilated front seats, AR head-up display, wireless Android Auto and CarPlay, and 540-degree camera.
- Spacious 3-row seating with up to 4,076 litres (143.9 cu ft) of passenger volume (first two rows), 527 litres (18.6 cu ft) boot (third row folded), and 150 litres (5.3 cu ft) frunk.

=== Safety ===
All variants include a high-strength body, 6-7 airbags, all-disc brakes, brake-by-wire, and an electronic parking brake. Level 2+ ADAS (adaptive cruise control, lane centering, blind-spot monitoring, emergency steering) uses five radars, 12 sensors, and a forward camera in top trims. Suspension features front Mahindra-iLINK struts and rear 5-link independent setup.

Bharat NCAP test results Mahindra XEV 9S (2026, based on Latin NCAP 2016)
Test	Score	Stars
Adult occupant protection	31.15/32.00	5 /5 stars
Child occupant protection	45.00/49.00	5 /5 stars

== Powertrain ==
Mahindra XEV 9S offers three battery pack options paired with rear-wheel-drive (RWD) electric motors and single-speed automatic transmissions. At launch, all three battery packs use Blade LFP cells supplied by FinDreams in a pack co-designed by German consultant FEV and assembled in Chakan, Maharashtra.

AC charging takes 6-8 hours (7.2–11.2 kW); DC supports rapid top-ups via CCS-II port. All variants achieve 0–100 km/h (62 mph) in about 7 seconds, top speed of 202 km/h (126 mph), with drive modes including Range, Everyday, Race, Snow, and regenerative braking.

Specifications
Battery		Power	Torque	Range (MIDC)	DC fast charging	
Capacity	Type	Power	Torque	Range (MIDC)	Peak	20–80% time
59 kWh	LFP FinDreams	228 bhp (170 kW; 231 PS)	380 N⋅m (280 lb⋅ft)	521 km (324 mi)	140 kW	20 min
70 kWh	LFP FinDreams	241 bhp (180 kW; 244 PS)	380 N⋅m (280 lb⋅ft)	600 km (373 mi)	160 kW	20 min
79 kWh	LFP FinDreams	282 bhp (210 kW; 286 PS)	380 N⋅m (280 lb⋅ft)	679 km (422 mi)	180 kW	20 min
