= XUV =

XUV may refer to:

== Automobiles ==
- Crossover utility vehicle, a denomination used by some manufacturers for a car-based SUV, abbreviated as XUV
- GMC Envoy, a 1997–2008 American mid-size SUV, pickup truck variant called Envoy XUV
- HSV Avalanche, a 2003–2005 Australian mid-size performance crossover, pickup truck variant called Avalanche XUV
- Mahindra XUV, a series of Indian SUVs which include:
  - Mahindra XUV300, a 2019–present subcompact SUV
  - Mahindra XUV500, a 2011–2021 compact SUV
  - Mahindra XUV700, a 2021–present compact SUV

== Science and technology ==
- Extreme ultraviolet radiation
