= Chery eQ5 =

Battery electric compact crossover SUV

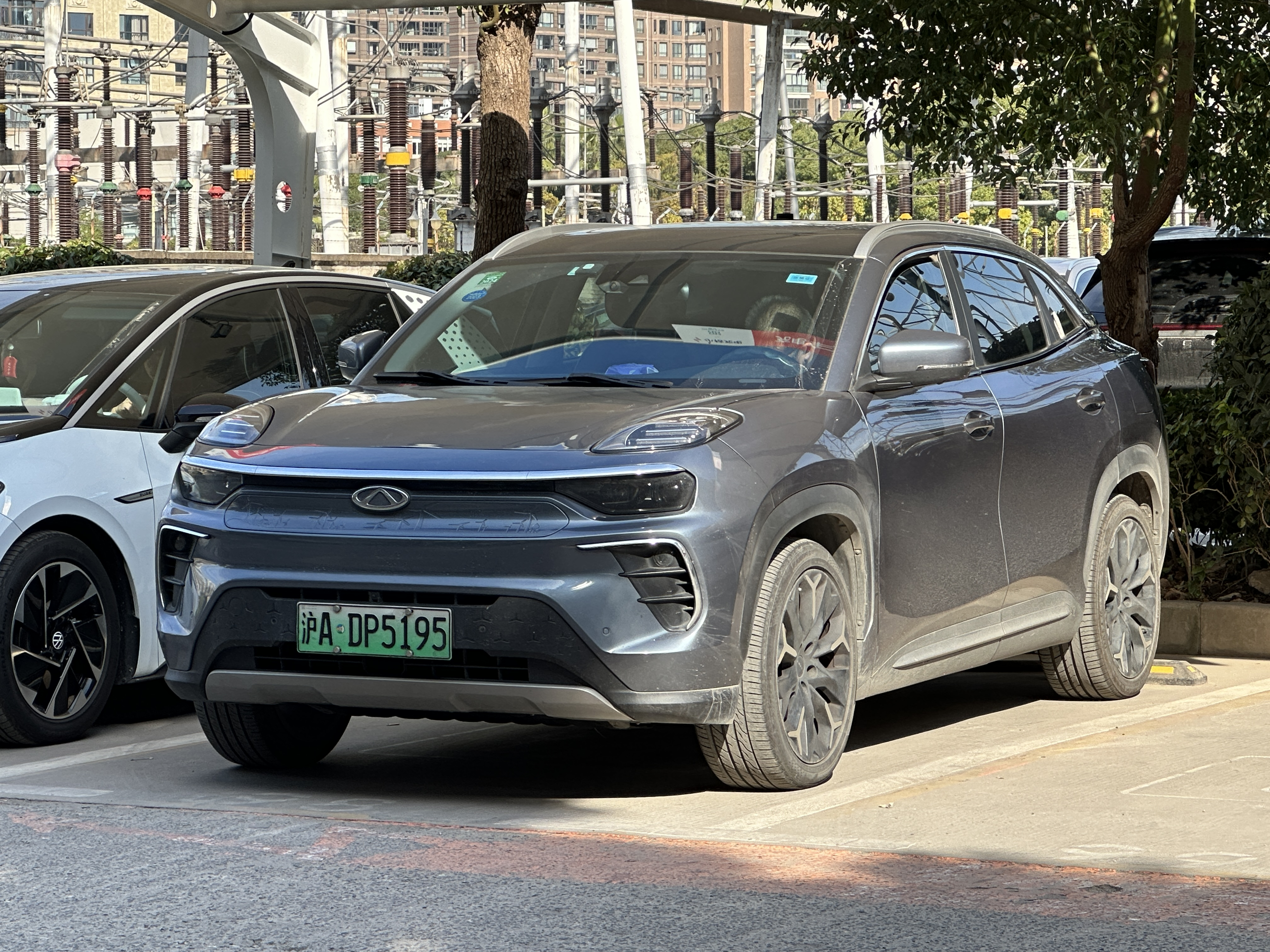

Overview
- Manufacturer: Chery
- Model code: S61
- Production: 2020–2023
- Assembly: China: Wuhu, Anhui
- Designer: Pininfarina; Exterior: Aydar Nigmatullin; Po-Yuan Huang; Interior: Zhen Yue

Body and chassis
- Class: Compact crossover SUV
- Body style: 5-door SUV
- Layout: Rear-motor, rear-wheel drive
- Platform: LFS high-strength aluminum-magnesium alloy smart vehicle platform
- Related: Chery eQ7

Powertrain
- Electric motor: Permanent Magnet Synchronous Reluctance Motor
- Electric range: 510 kilometres (317 mi) (NEDC-rated)
- Plug-in charging: 11 to 13 hours (with a 6.6 kW charger); 0.5 hours (30% to 80% State of charge)

Dimensions
- Wheelbase: 2,830 mm (111 in)
- Length: 4,630 mm (182 in)
- Width: 1,910 mm (75 in)
- Height: 1,655 mm (65 in)
- Curb weight: High-output: 1,910 kg (4,210 lb); Low/Standard-output: 1,760 kg (3,880 lb)

Chronology
- Successor: Chery eQ7

The Chery eQ5 is a battery electric compact crossover SUV produced by Chery from 2020 to 2023.

The Chinese name Ant (蚂蚁) is for creating an Ant-themed electric vehicles family within the NEV product series Chery. The company already has an electric city car in the product line called the Little Ant (小蚂蚁) in Chinese or Chery eQ1, and launched the Chery Ant Concept in 2013.

== Overview ==
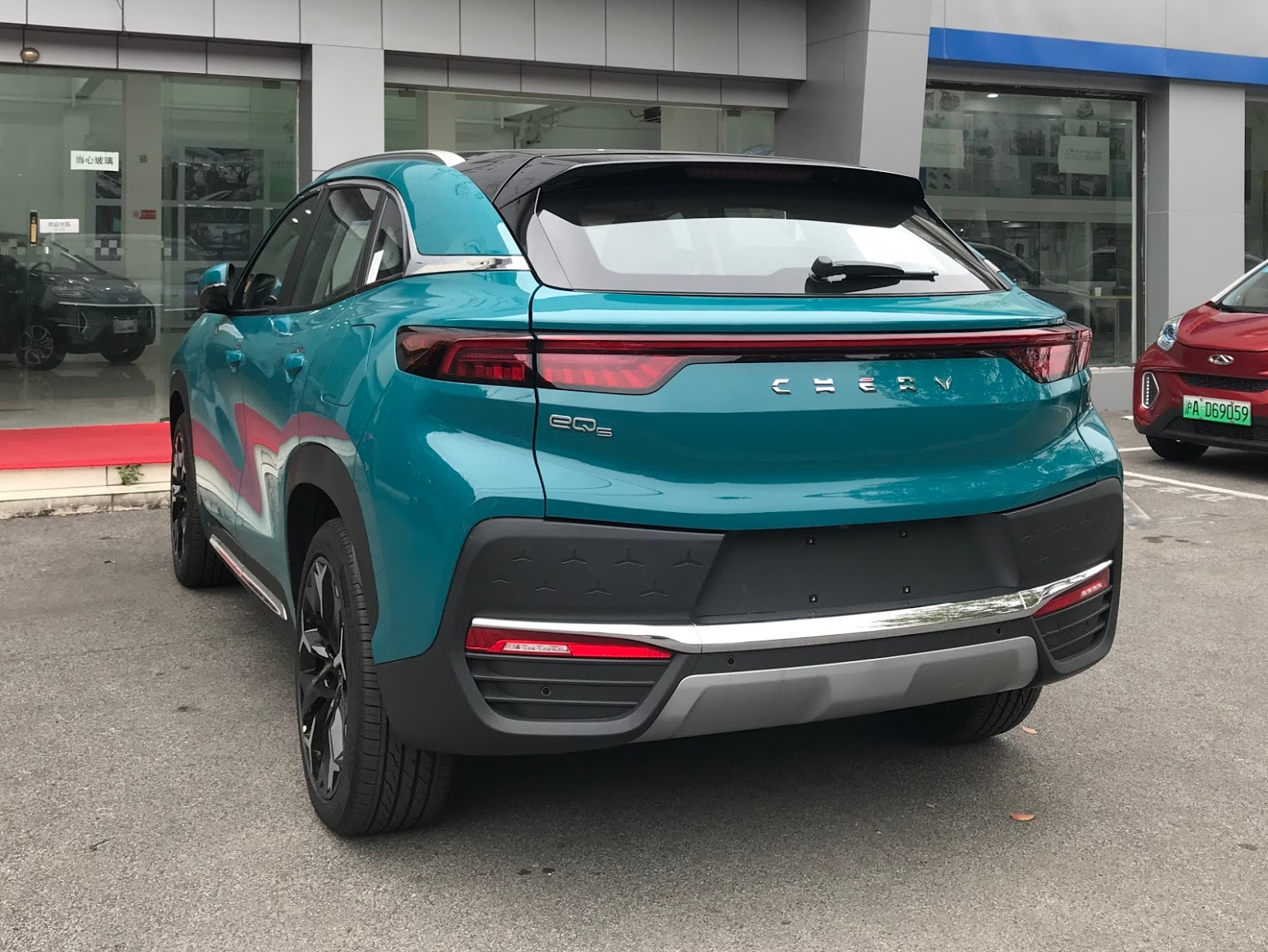
Rear view

In August 2019, Chery NEV officials mentioned that the firm was developing an all-aluminum platform for pure electric vehicle models and will build electric models by 2020 including the S81, S61, and S57. The three models mentioned would mainly be coupes and SUVs and be capable of equipping electric four-wheel drive system. Additionally, Chery has disclosed that the model built on the all-aluminum pure electric platform will cooperate with tech companies from China, and is expected to provide facial recognition, ADAS, and 5G-V2X. As of December 2019, news of an electric crossover SUV by Chery codenamed the S61 went offline surfaced. The electric S61 debuts a new exterior styling design language and is based on a newly developed all-aluminum pure electric platform. The production version of the S61 model was scheduled to launch in mid 2020. Chery unveiled the eQ5 in August 2020, with the electric crossover going on sale at the end of August.

== Technical details ==
The Chery eQ5 is built on Chery's new LFS high-strength aluminum-magnesium alloy smart vehicle platform that is only 60 percent the weight of a conventional vehicle's platform. The LFS high-strength aluminum-magnesium alloy smart vehicle platform has 93 percent of the body frame using aluminium-magnesium alloy, and the weight of the frame of the platform is only 94.4 kilograms (208 lb) or 60 percent the weight of the structure of vehicles that uses conventional platforms.

Three rear-wheel-drive variants including the low-output, standard-output, and high-output variants were planned at launch with a single electric motor mounted at the rear. The motor of the low-output variant would producing 120 kW (161 hp; 163 PS) and 250 N⋅m (184 lb⋅ft) of torque. The motor of the standard-output variant is tuned to produce 133 kW (178 hp; 181 PS) and 280 N⋅m (207 lb⋅ft) of torque. The motor of the high-output variant is tuned to produce 150 kW (201 hp; 204 PS) and 295 N⋅m (218 lb⋅ft) of torque.

The Chery eQ5 low-output and standard-output variants uses a 70.1 kWh lithium-ion battery pack weighing only 456 kilograms (1,005 lb) and the NEDC rated range is 510 kilometres (317 mi), while the high-output variants uses a 88 kWh lithium-ion battery pack with the NEDC rated range reaching 620 kilometres (385 mi).

== Interior technologies ==
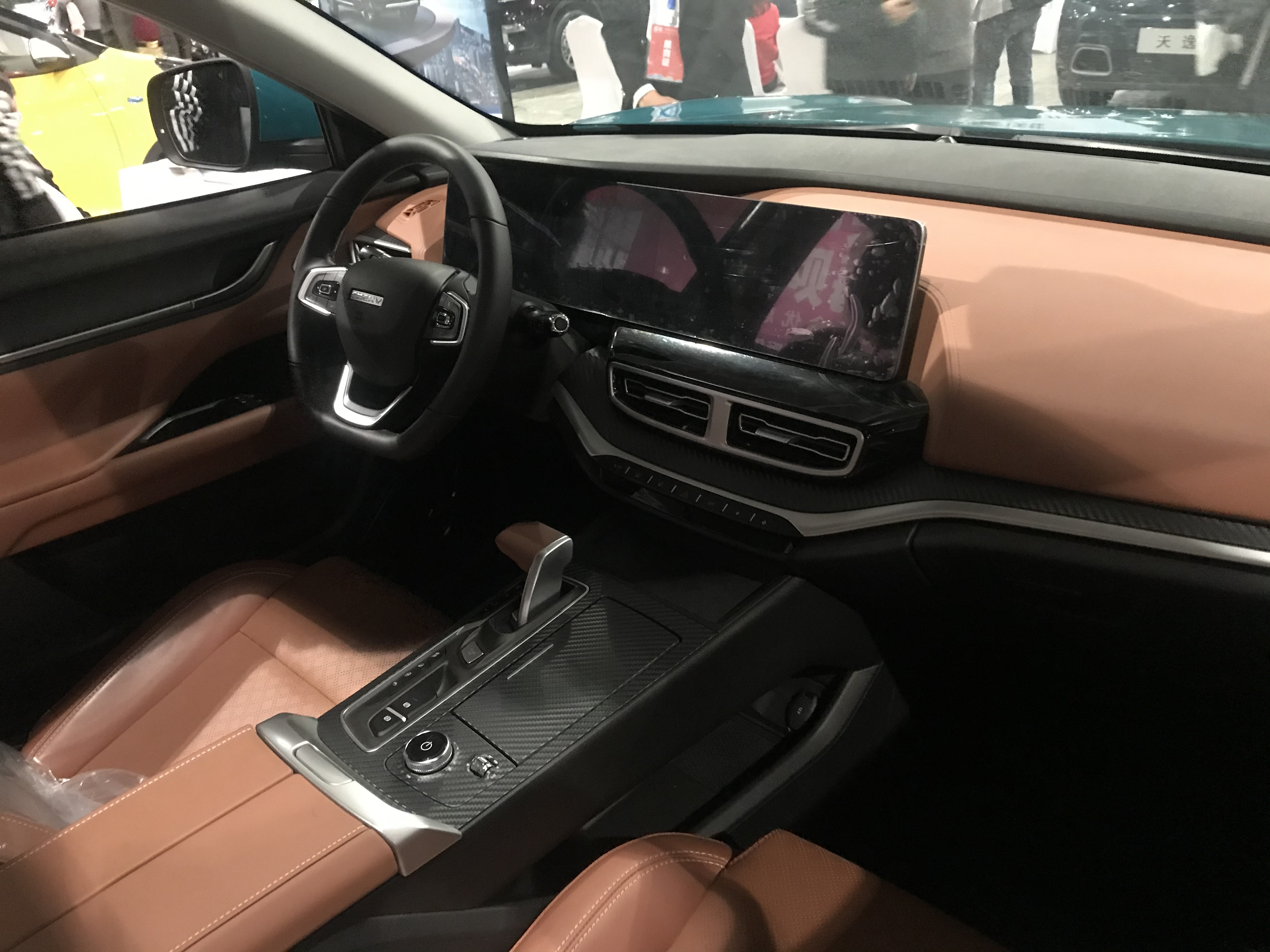
Interior

The interior of the eQ5 has a fully digital instrument panel and central infotainment display, with interior features like dual 12.3-inch displays as virtual instrument cluster and touchscreen infotainment system, 220-volt power outlet, Qi fast wireless charger, facial recognition, air quality management system (AQS), CN95-standard air filter, electric-powered seats, black panoramic sunroof, etc. According to Chinese media reports previously, the list of infotainment system features include an artificial intelligence voice recognition system, multi-screen interaction, over-the-air software updates, Advanced Driver Assistance System and 5G-V2X.

It is said that the Chery eQ5 is the first vehicle to use onboard technologies such as the Huawei's Harmony OS infotainment system. The eQ5 features include a Level 2 autonomous system assisted by 20 sensors, adaptive cruise control, parking assist, head-on collision prevention, blind zone monitoring, and lane change control.
