= Chery eQ7 =

Battery electric compact crossover SUV

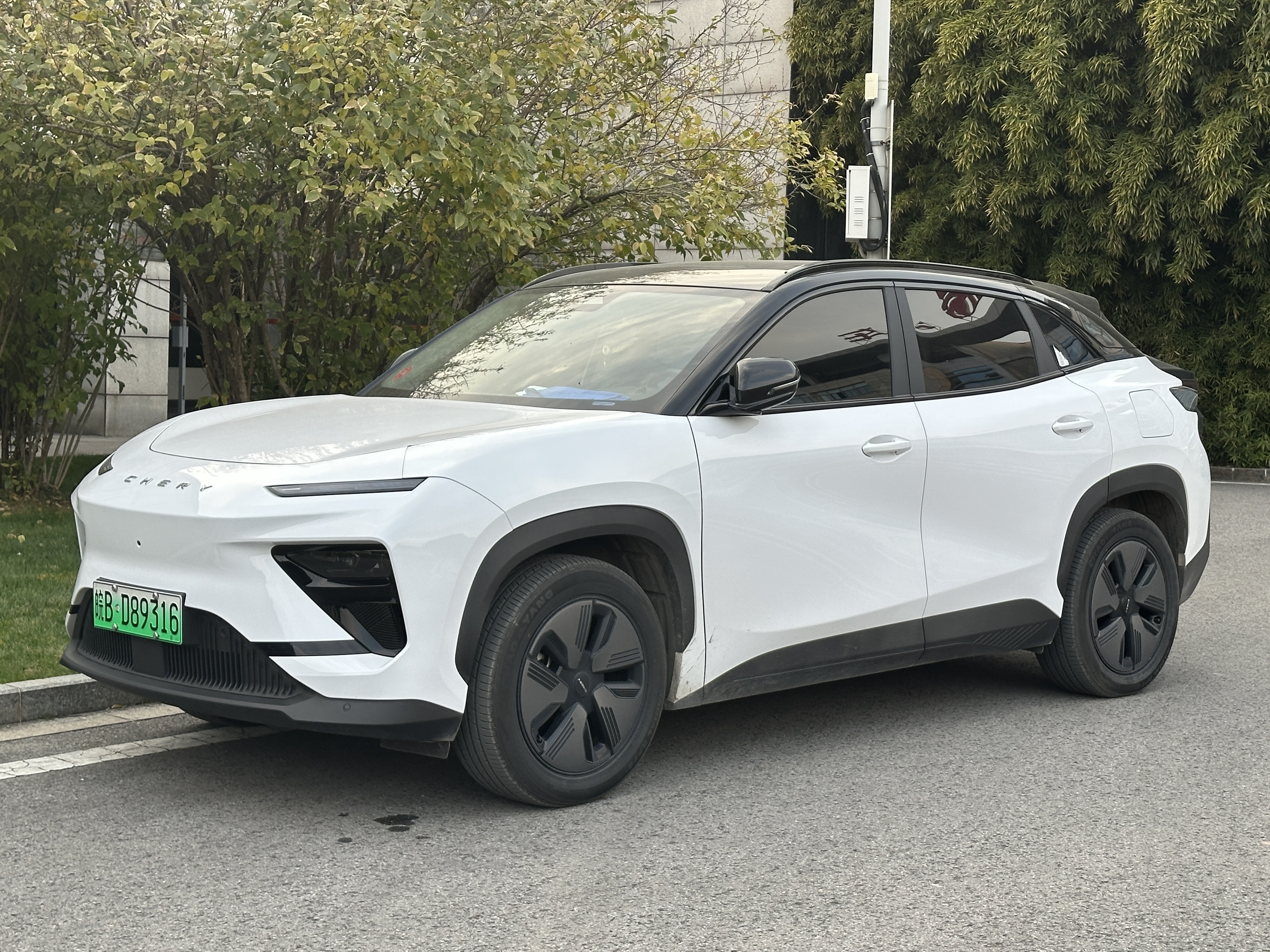

Overview
- Manufacturer: Chery
- Also called: Chery Tiggo 6 (export); Aiqar eQ7 (Armenia, Bolivia, Cambodia, Curaçao, Georgia, Uzbekistan)
- Production: July 2023 – present
- Assembly: China: Wuhu, Anhui

Body and chassis
- Class: Compact crossover SUV
- Body style: 5-door SUV
- Layout: Rear-motor, rear-wheel drive
- Platform: LFS high-strength aluminum-magnesium alloy smart vehicle platform
- Related: Chery eQ5

Powertrain
- Electric motor: Permanent Magnet Synchronous Reluctance Motor
- Electric range: Standard range: 412 kilometres (256 mi) (NEDC-rated); Long range: 512 kilometres (318 mi) (NEDC-rated)
- Plug-in charging: 8 hours (with a 6.6 kW charger); 0.5 hours (30% to 80% State of charge)

Dimensions
- Wheelbase: 2,830 mm (111 in)
- Length: 4,675 mm (184 in)
- Width: 1,910 mm (75 in)
- Height: 1,660 mm (65 in)
- Curb weight: Standard range: 1,771 kg (3,900 lb); Long range: 1,787–1,850 kg (3,940–4,080 lb)

Chronology
- Predecessor: Chery eQ5

The Chery eQ7 is a battery electric compact crossover SUV produced by Chery since 2023. Being essentially a facelift of the eQ5, only the front end and rear bumper was restyled, and dimensions are mostly the same.

== Overview ==
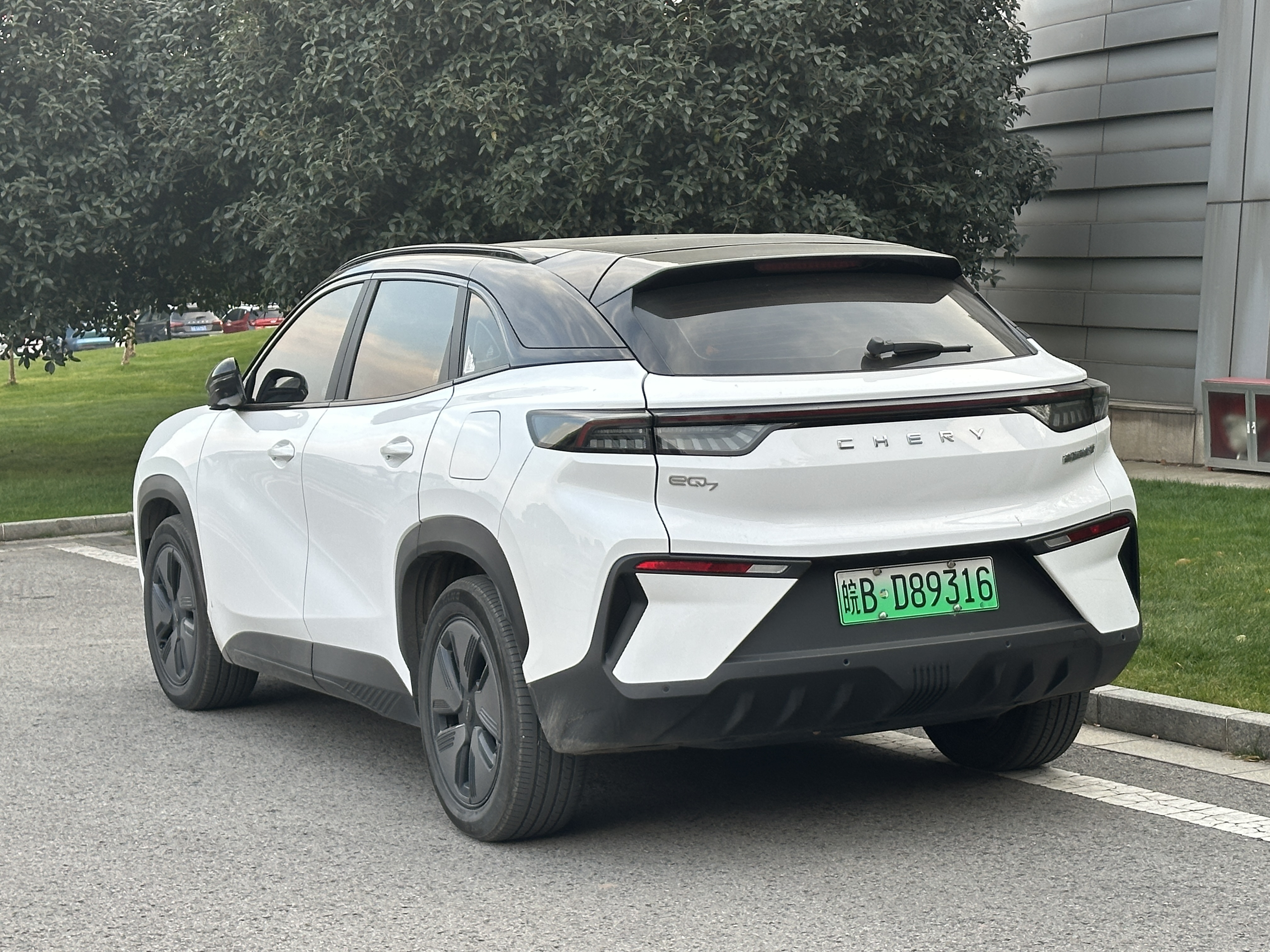
Rear view

The Chery eQ7 is powered by electric motors producing 135kW and 155kW with torque of 225N·m and 285N·m respectively. The top speed is 180km/h and 0-100km/h acceleration takes 8 seconds. The CLTC electric driving range is 412km and 512km for variants equipped with 53.87kWh and 67.12kWh batteries respectively.
