= Mahindra XUV 7XO =

Compact crossover SUV

Overview
- Manufacturer: Mahindra & Mahindra
- Production: January 2026 – present
- Assembly: India: Chakan, Maharashtra

Body and chassis
- Class: Compact crossover SUV (C)
- Body style: 5-door SUV
- Layout: Petrol: Front-engine, front-wheel-drive; Diesel: Front-engine, front-wheel-drive or all-wheel-drive
- Related: Mahindra XUV700; Mahindra XEV 9S

Powertrain
- Engine: Petrol: 2.0 L mStallion I4 turbo; Diesel: 2.2 L mHawk I4 turbo
- Power output: 200 hp (149 kW; 203 PS) (petrol); 182 hp (136 kW; 185 PS) (diesel)
- Transmission: 6-speed manual 6-speed automatic

Dimensions
- Wheelbase: 2,750 mm (108.3 in)
- Length: 4,695 mm (184.8 in)
- Width: 1,890 mm (74.4 in)
- Height: 1,755 mm (69.1 in)
- Kerb weight: 2,040 kg (4,497 lb)

Chronology
- Predecessor: Mahindra XUV700 (pre-facelift)

The Mahindra XUV 7XO is a compact crossover SUV produced by the Indian automaker Mahindra & Mahindra. It has been sold in the Indian market since January 2026. Like the XUV 3XO, the facelifted version of the XUV300, the 7XO is the facelifted version of the XUV700. Its electric variant is called XEV 9S.

== Overview ==
The Mahindra XUV 7XO was introduced on 5 January 2026, as a facelift of the XUV700. The XUV 7XO comes with the same engine options as the XUV700, a refreshed design, and new technology features compared to that of what the XUV700 had.

== Design and features ==
The front features a wider full-width grille with talon accents, slimmer C-shaped LED DRLs, sequential turn indicators, and Bi-LED projector headlights. Side profile retains flush door handles and gains new 18- or 19-inch alloys depending on the variant. The rear includes smoked honeycomb LED taillights connected by a piano black panel and mesh-pattern bumper. The taillights were borrowed from the XEV 9S.

The cabin has three 12.3-inch screens—one for the driver, one for the infotainment, and one for the passenger, and uses an off-white, chestnut brown, and black color scheme. The central console uses rotary knobs, leatherette finishes, and has a flat-bottom steering wheel. Dual-zone climate control, ambient lighting, and six-way powered seats with memory settings also come standard.

== Powertrain and chassis ==
The XUV7XO continues to offer a petrol engine and one diesel engine option, as was with the XUV 700. The petrol engine is a 2.0-litre four-cylinder turbocharged mStallion unit which is tuned to produce 200 hp (149 kW; 203 PS) and 380 N⋅m (38.7 kg⋅m; 280 lb⋅ft) of torque. The diesel option is a 2.2-litre four-cylinder mHawk turbodiesel. The diesel engine 182 hp (136 kW; 185 PS) and 420 N⋅m (42.8 kg⋅m; 310 lb⋅ft) of torque for manual models or 450 N⋅m (45.9 kg⋅m; 332 lb⋅ft) of torque for automatic models. The transmissions are a 6-speed manual and a 6-speed torque converter automatic. The 153 horsepower option for the diesel that was present on the XUV700 was eliminated for the XUV 7XO. Diesel models offer all-wheel-drive as optional, but only on automatic models.

The XUV 7XO uses MacPherson struts for front suspension and a multilink axle for the rear suspension with frequency-selective damping also being utilised. Mahindra's DAVINCI suspension is introduced on the XUV 7XO.

== Safety ==
Bharat NCAP test results Mahindra XUV 7X) (2026, based on Latin NCAP 2016)
Test	Score	Stars
Adult occupant protection	30.76/32.00	5 /5 stars
Child occupant protection	44.97/49.00	5 /5 stars

== Variants ==
The Mahindra XUV 7XO is available in six variants with only AdrenoX Series available, as the MX Series which was previously used in Mahindra Thar Roxx, Mahindra XUV 3XO and Mahindra XUV700, was discontinued. The Mahindra XUV 7XO offers six main trim levels: AX (base), AX3, AX5, AX7, AX7T (Tech), and AX7L (Luxury), with a total of 27 combinations available. Prices range from ₹13.66 lakh (AX petrol MT) to ₹24.92 lakh (AX7L diesel AWD AT), introductory for first 40,000 units.
