= Mahindra XUV500 =

Compact crossover SUV

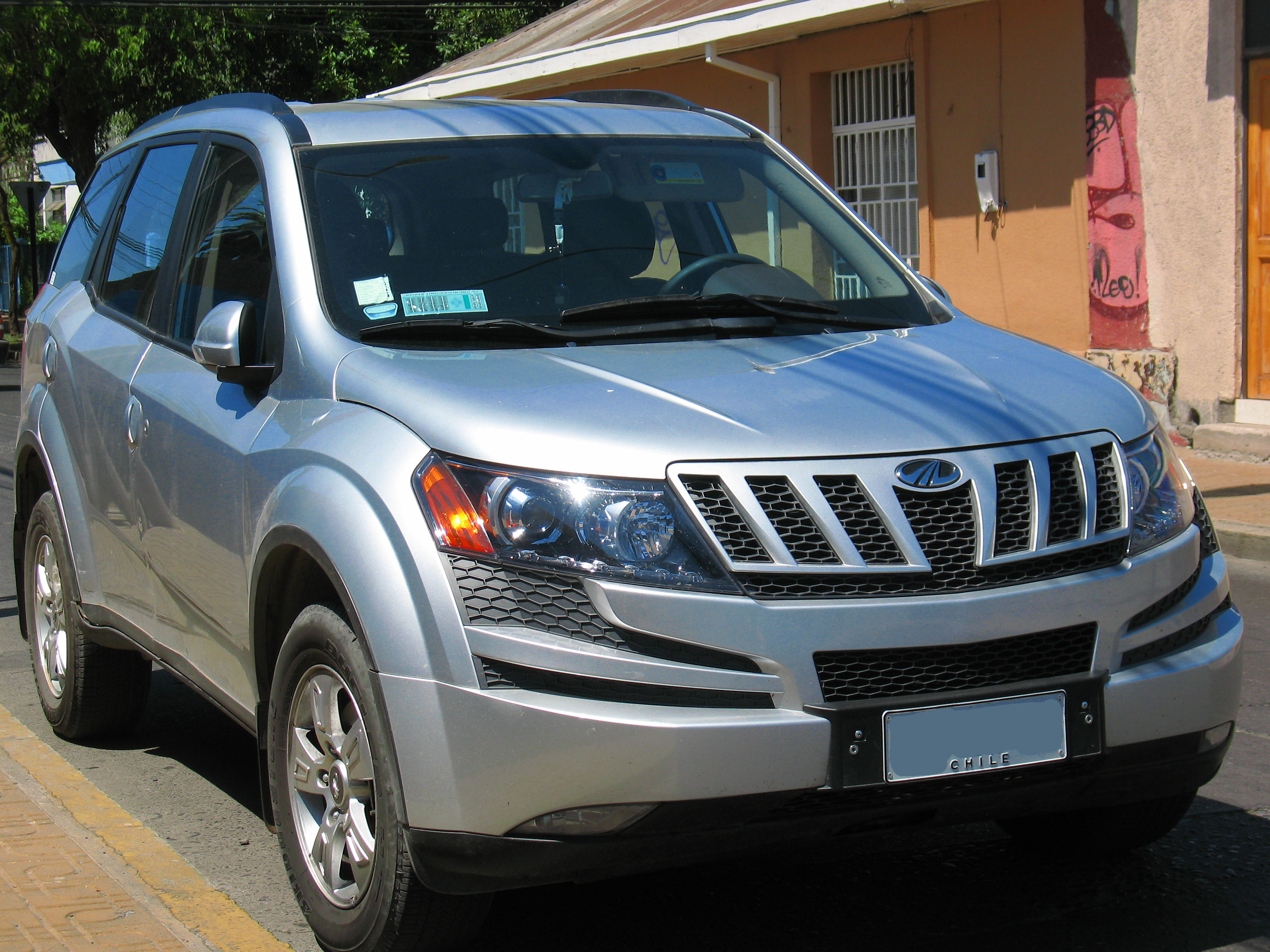
- Mahindra XUV500 pre-facelift front view

Overview
- Manufacturer: Mahindra & Mahindra
- Production: 2011–2021
- Assembly: India: Chakan, Maharashtra; Nashik, Maharashtra
- Designer: Peter Stevens

Body and chassis
- Class: Compact crossover SUV
- Body style: 5-door SUV
- Layout: Front-engine, front-wheel-drive or all-wheel-drive

Powertrain
- Engine: Petrol: 2.2 L mHawk140 turbo MPFI; I4; Diesel: 2.2 L DW12 mHawk140 turbo I4; 2.2 L mHawk155 turbo I4; 1.99 L mHawk140 turbo I4
- Transmission: 6-speed manual 6-speed automatic

Dimensions
- Wheelbase: 2,700 mm (110 in)
- Length: 4,585 mm (180.5 in)
- Width: 1,890 mm (74 in)
- Height: 1,785 mm (70.3 in)

Chronology
- Successor: Mahindra XUV700

The Mahindra XUV500 is a compact crossover SUV produced by the Indian automobile manufacturer Mahindra & Mahindra. The XUV500 was designed and developed at Mahindra's design and vehicle build center in Nashik and Chennai and is manufactured in Mahindra's Chakan & Nashik plant, India. During its development, the car was code-named 'W201'. It is the first monocoque chassis-based vehicle the company has produced.

It is succeeded by the XUV700, which was planned to be the second-generation XUV500 during development.

== History ==
=== Pre facelift (W201) (2011-2015) ===
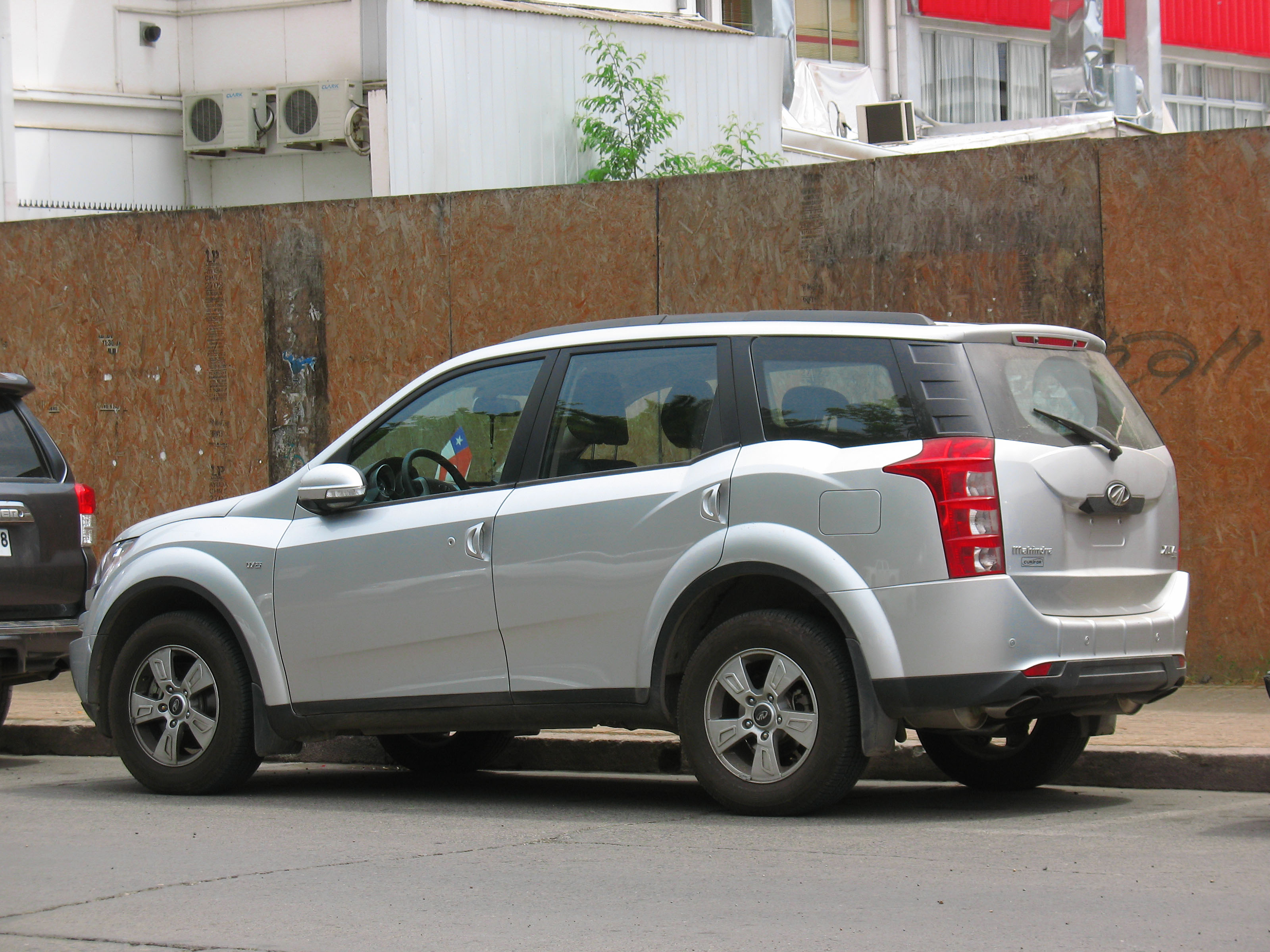
Mahindra XUV500 side and rear (W6)

The XUV500 was launched in 2 variants (W6 and W8) in 2011, sharing the same engine: the W6 in two-wheel drive only and the W8 in both two-wheel drive and AWD.

The W6 includes a 6-inch monochrome infotainment display, two airbags, ABS with electronic brakeforce distribution (EBD), and disc brakes on all alloy wheels.

The W8 can be specified in two or All-wheel drive. The W8 adds GPS navigation, six airbags, a touch screen, electronic stability program (ESP) with rollover mitigation, Hill Hold and Hill Descent control, alloy wheels, and leather upholstery.

Mahindra later added a W4 base variant and sports edition in 2013. An Xclusive edition with added features such as sunroof, reverse camera, powered seats, aluminum paddles, and others was introduced in 2014.

=== First facelift (W207) (2015-2018) ===
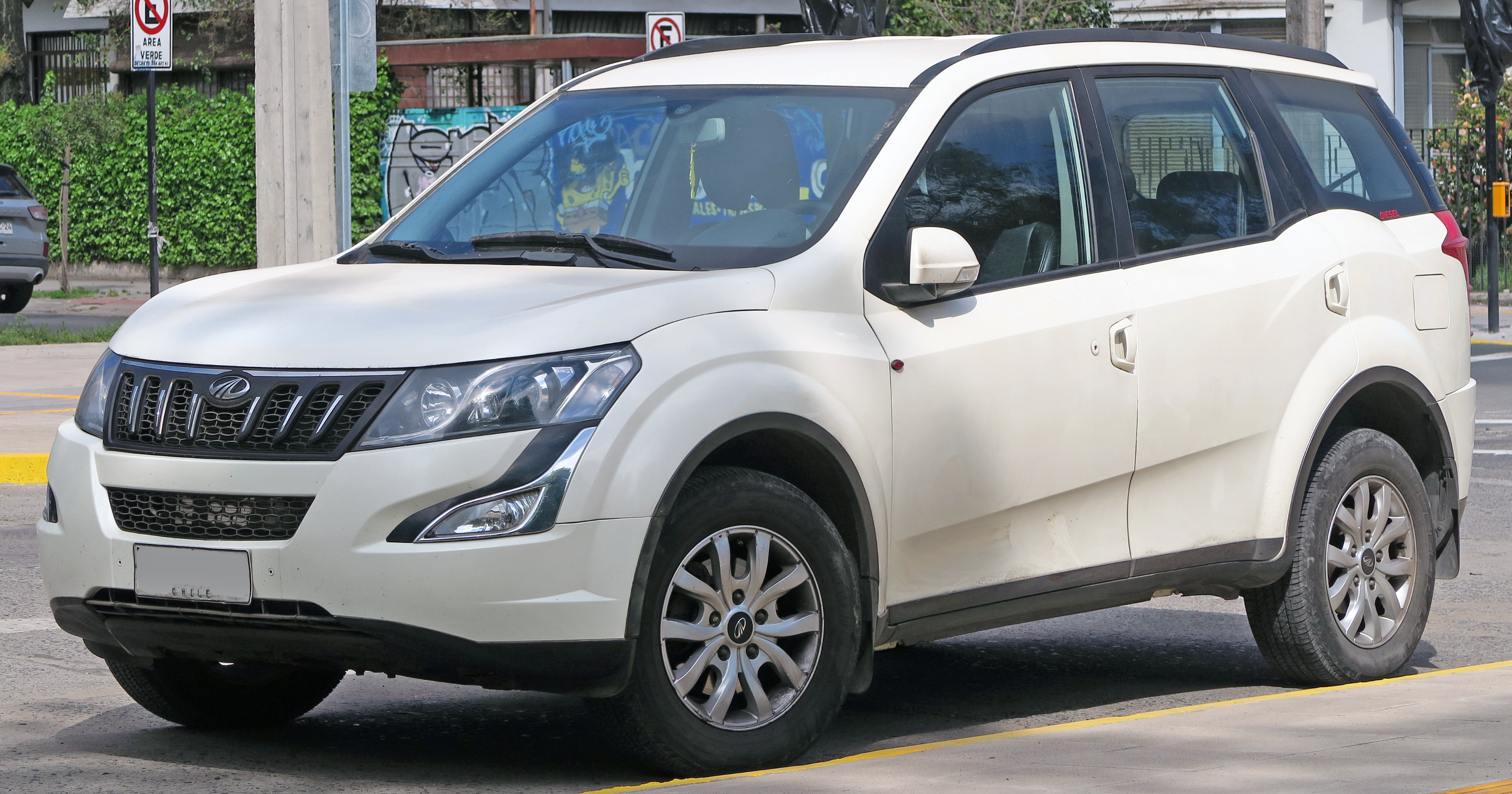
2018 XUV500 W8

The XUV500 was facelifted in May 2015. After the facelift, the top-end W10 variant was launched with features like an electric single-pane sunroof, push-start button, six airbags,etc. Features like a rear wiper, dual front airbags and projector headlamps were standard accros the range Automatic transmission was announced to be offered on the W8, W10 and W10 (O) AWD in November 2015, being available from December 5, 2015 onwards. Later on, an automatic transmission was also offered in the W6. A petrol version (G AT) was launched with a 2.2L turbo I4 with a liquid intercooler. There was also a sports edition based on the W10. The vehicle came with a 1.99L diesel engine for the Delhi NCR region.

=== Second facelift (W208) (2018) ===
On April 18, 2018, another facelifted version of the Mahindra XUV500 was released. It was released with a more powerful diesel engine with a horsepower increase of 15 hp to 155 hp and torque increase by 30Nm to 360Nm.

Mahindra also changed the naming system of the variants. There were W3, W5, W7, W9, W11, W11(o), AWD and G AT variants. Instead of even numbers, Mahindra used odd numbers, to denote the step up from the earlier variants.

In the second facelift, there were minor styling tweaks, and feature updates and got eVGT which bump power from 140 hp to 155 hp and torque from 330NM to 360NM.

The entire rear fascia has been changed and now the W11 variant gets dual-tone alloys instead of the monotone ones in the previous generation. Features like a rear wiper are now missing from the base W3 due to cost-cutting to rival the newly-launched Tata Harrier.

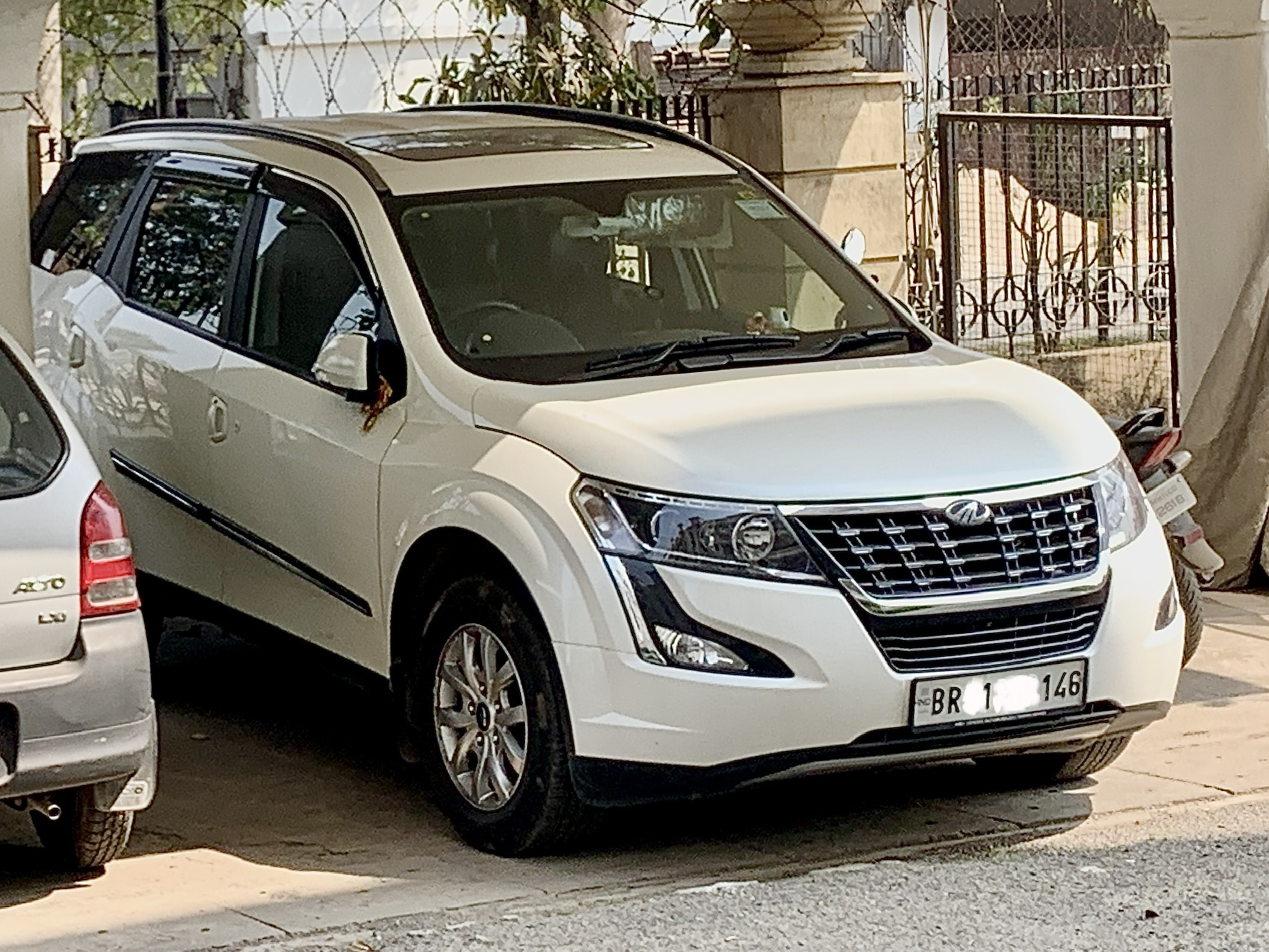
2018 Mahindra XUV500 W9 (front)

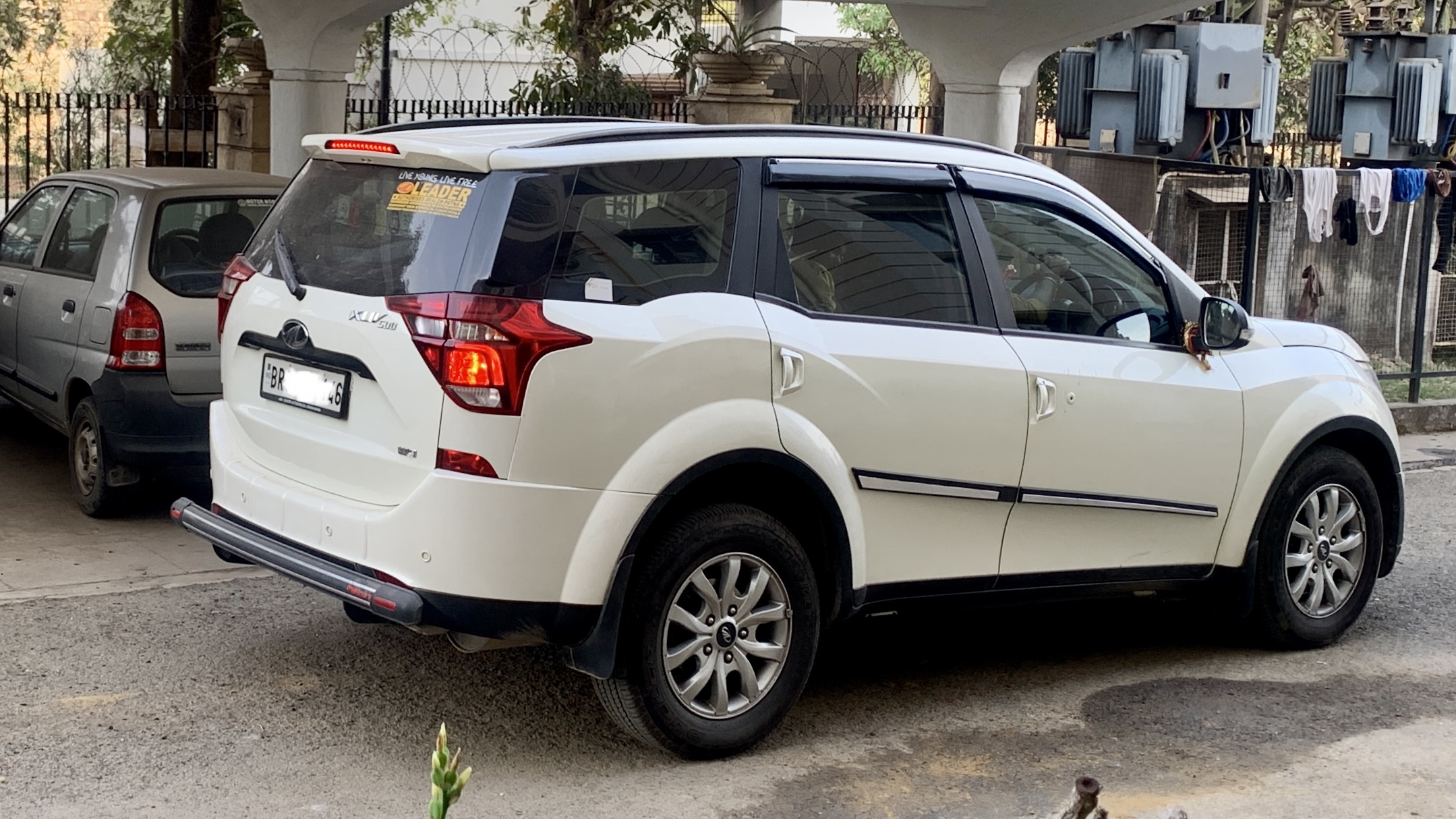
2018 Mahindra XUV500 W9 (rear)

== Safety ==
ANCAP test results Mahindra XUV500 (2012)
Test	Score
Overall	4 /5 stars
Frontal offset	10/16
Side impact	16/16
Pole	Not Assessed
Seat belt reminders	0/3
Whiplash protection	Good
Pedestrian protection	Marginal
Electronic stability control	Standard

The Mahindra XUV500 earned a solid four-star safety rating in its most basic safety specifications (the W6/W8 variant was tested).

== Exports ==
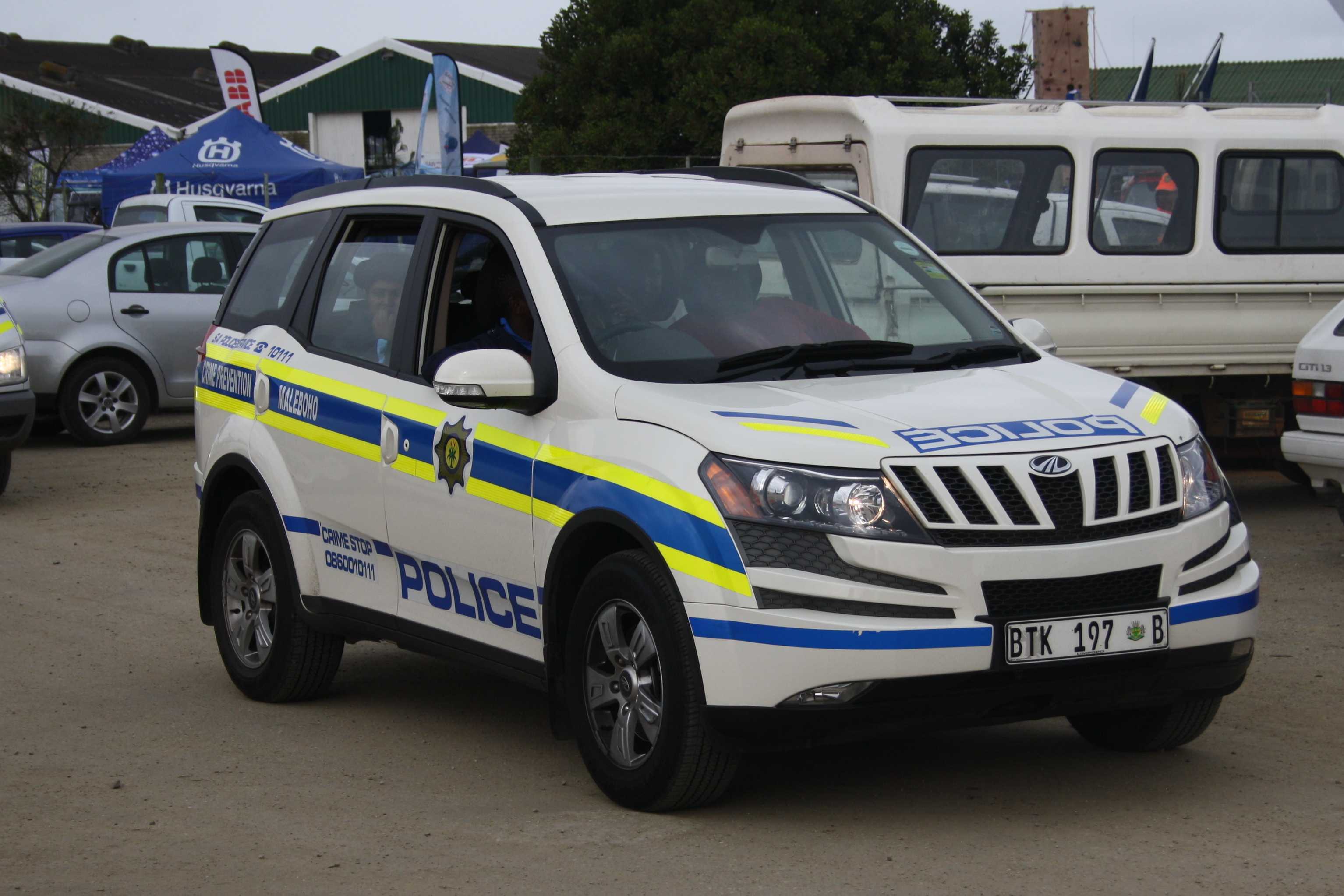
Mahindra XUV500 in South Africa Police livery

Mahindra announced that the SUV would be exported to Australia, Chile, Italy, Nepal, New Zealand, Peru, South Africa, Middle East and Spain as a complete knock-down.

In the South African market, sales of the XUV500 exceeded 1,200 units by February 2013.

== Motorsports ==
The Mahindra XUV500 secured first place in the 2014 Desert Storm Rally and clocked the fastest time in three sections of the rally.
