= Mahindra XUV700 =

Compact crossover SUV

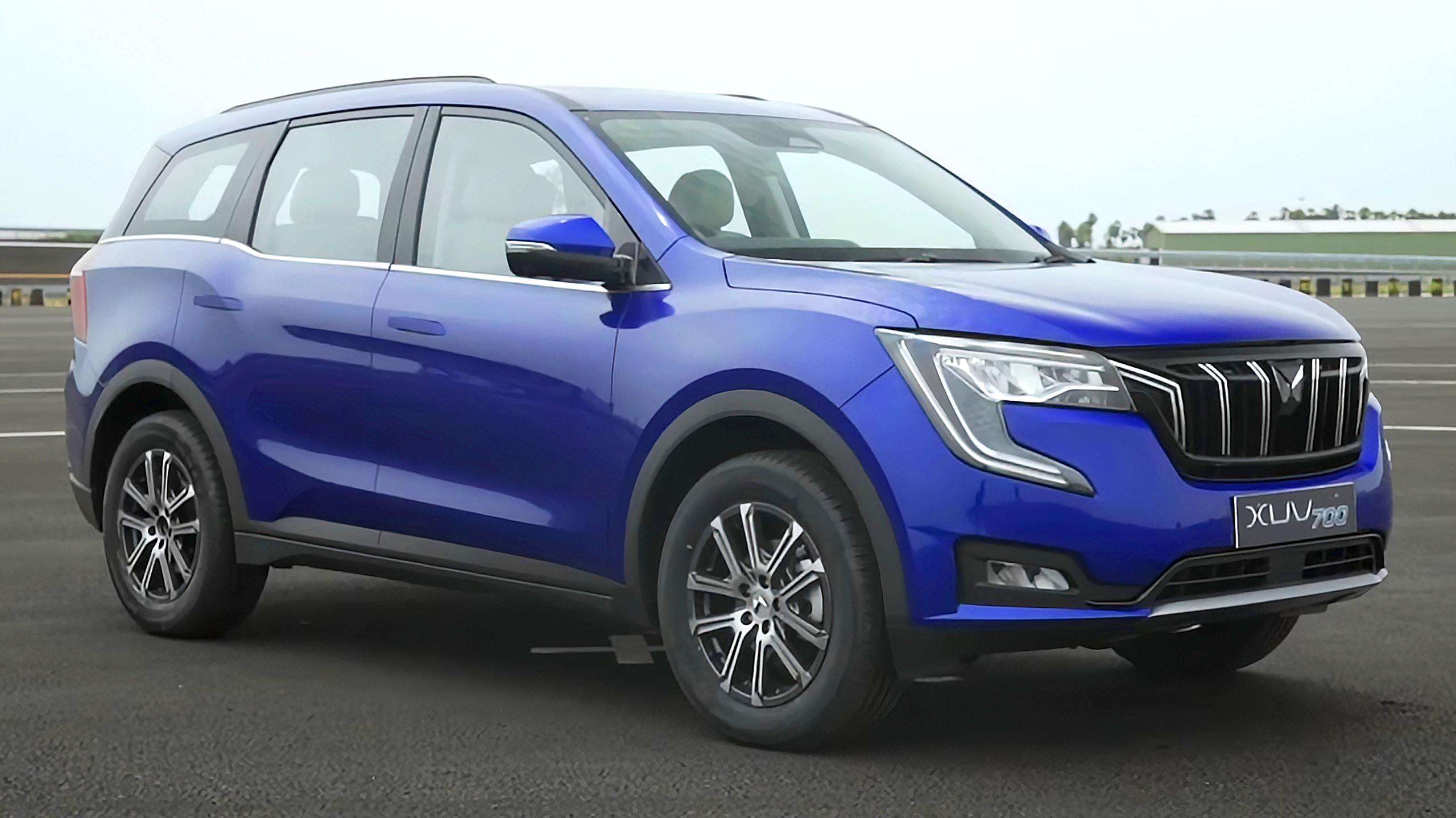

Overview
- Manufacturer: Mahindra & Mahindra
- Model code: W601
- Also called: Mahindra XEV 9S (Electric version); Mahindra XUV 7XO (facelift)
- Production: September 2021 – present
- Assembly: India: Chakan, Maharashtra

Body and chassis
- Class: Compact crossover SUV
- Body style: 5-door SUV
- Layout: Front-engine, front-wheel-drive, all-wheel-drive or rear-motor, rear-wheel-drive (XEV 9S)

Powertrain
- Engine: Petrol: 2.0 L mStallion I4 turbo; Diesel: 2.2 L mHawk I4 turbo
- Transmission: 6-speed manual 6-speed automatic

Dimensions
- Wheelbase: 2,750 mm (108.3 in)
- Length: 4,695 mm (184.8 in)
- Width: 1,890 mm (74.4 in)
- Height: 1,755 mm (69.1 in)
- Kerb weight: 2,040 kg (4,497 lb)

Chronology
- Predecessor: Mahindra XUV500
- Successor: Mahindra XUV 7XO (facelift)

The Mahindra XUV700 is a compact crossover SUV produced by the Indian automobile manufacturer Mahindra & Mahindra. Introduced in August 2021, the vehicle was originally positioned to replace the XUV500, but was launched as a separate model. The facelifted version is called the Mahindra XUV 7XO.

== Overview ==
The vehicle was introduced in India on 14 August 2021. The XUV700 was originally designed as the second-generation XUV500, however Mahindra decided to reposition the model nomenclature due to its plan of expanding its SUV portfolio. It is their first model to use the new Mahindra logo, which is reserved for their SUV products.

In India, the XUV700 is available in two series, which are MX and AdrenoX (AX). The MX series has a single MX trim, while the AdrenoX series consists of four trim levels, which are AX3, AX5, AX7 and AX7L. The AdrenoX series is equipped with the eponymous AdrenoX, an Amazon Alexa-based voice command. Both 5-seater and 7-seater configurations are available. The top-end variant is also equipped with advanced driver assistance system (ADAS) technology tuned for Indian road conditions, making it the first Mahindra product to receive Level 1 autonomous tech. Variants include MX, AX3, AX5, AX7, and AX7L, which is the top model.

The XUV700 went on sale in Australia in June 2023 with two variants available, the AX7 and AX7L, powered by the turbocharged 2.0-litre four-cylinder petrol engine.

The Electric variant of it is called the XEV 9S, launched in 2025 as part of Mahindra's broader Born Electric vision.

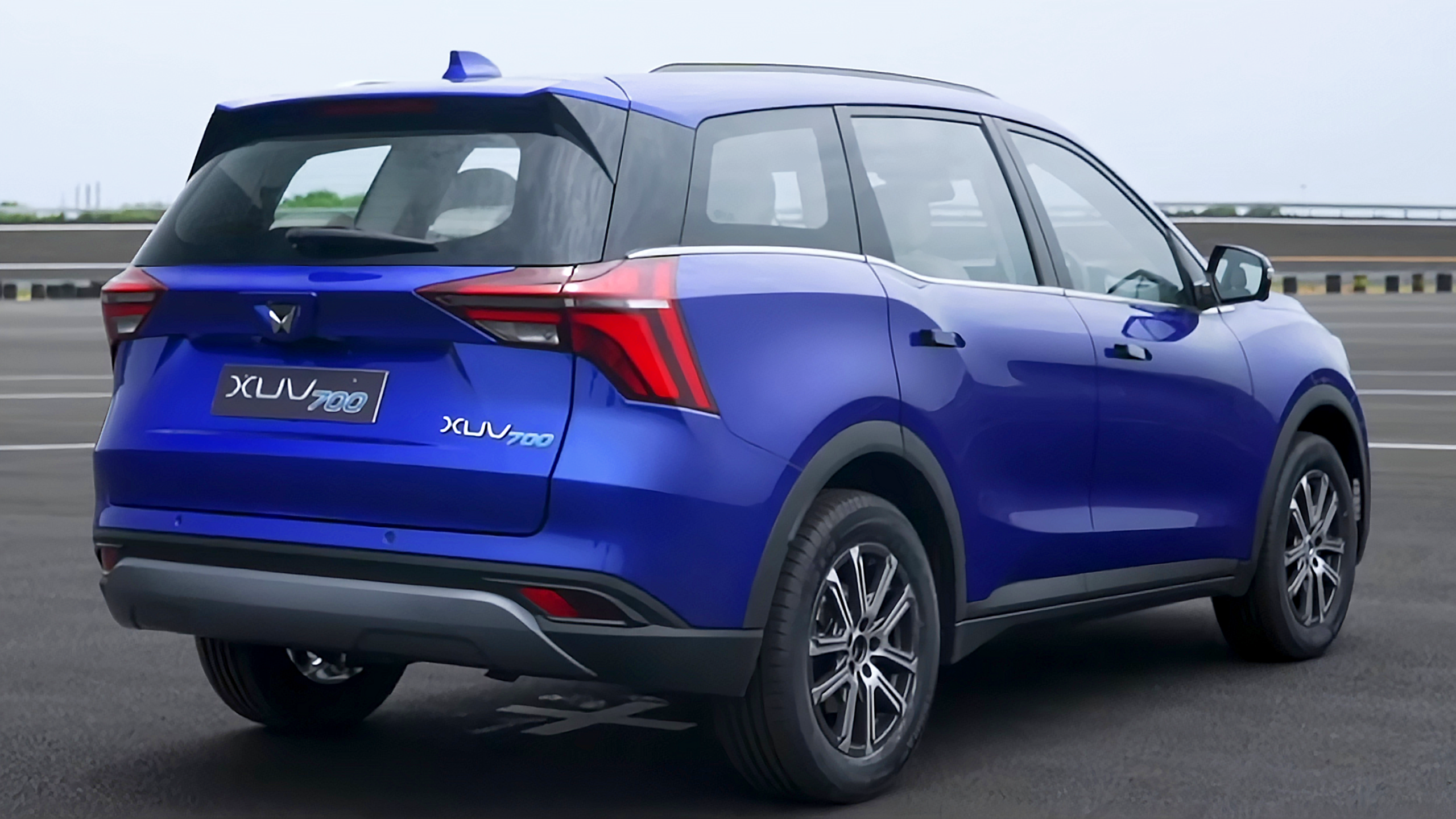
Rear view

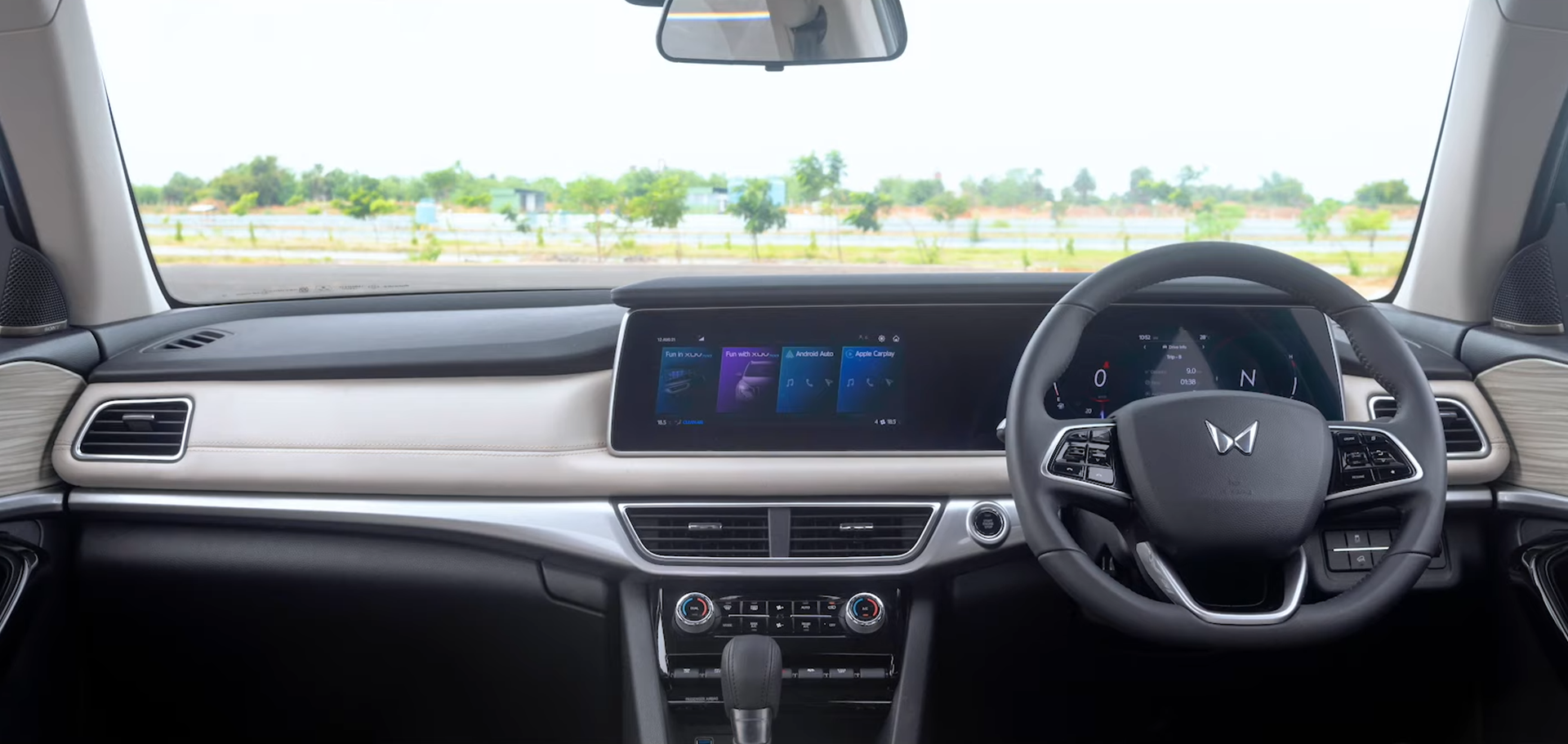
Interior

== Powertrain ==
The XUV700 is offered with one petrol engine and one diesel engine option. The former is a 2.0-litre four-cylinder turbocharged mStallion unit which is tuned to produce 202.85 PS (200 hp; 149 kW) and 380 N⋅m (38.7 kg⋅m; 280 lb⋅ft). The diesel option is a 2.2-litre four-cylinder mHawk turbodiesel. The entry level option of the engine produces 155 PS (153 hp; 114 kW) and 360 N⋅m (36.7 kg⋅m; 266 lb⋅ft), while the unit in higher variants is capable of 185 PS (182 hp; 136 kW) and 420 N⋅m (42.8 kg⋅m; 310 lb⋅ft) (manual) or 450 N⋅m (45.9 kg⋅m; 332 lb⋅ft) (automatic). Both engines can be had with 6-speed manual and 6-speed TC automatic transmission options, while the lower-spec diesel variant will only be available with a manual transmission. An all-wheel-drive variant is also available.

It has a claimed ARAI rated fuel efficiency of 15 km/L (35.28 mpg-US) and 17 km/L (40 mpg-US) for the petrol and diesel manual respectively and 13 km/L (30.58 mpg-US) and 16.5 km/L (38.95 mpg-US) for the petrol and diesel automatics respectively.

== Safety ==
The XUV700 achieved a 5 star rating for adult occupant protection and 4 stars for child occupant protection in 2021 Global NCAP 1.0 (similar to Latin NCAP 2013). The vehicle tested was the most basic safety specification, fitted with two airbags, ABS and ISOFIX anchorages. The model presented low risk of injury to most body regions in the frontal impact and passed regulatory ECE95 side impact requirements.

Global NCAP 1.0 test results (India) Mahindra XUV700 – 2 Airbags (2021, similar to Latin NCAP 2013)
| Test | Score | Stars |
|---|---|---|
| Adult occupant protection | 16.03/17.00 | 5 /5 stars |
| Child occupant protection | 41.66/49.00 | 4 /5 stars |

In June 2022 the XUV700 achieved a Global NCAP Safer Choice award for performance of its optional Electronic Stability Control and its pedestrian protection performance in adult and child head impacts and adult lower leg impact according to UN127 regulation.

== Sales ==
| Year | India |
|---|---|
| 2021 | 11,964 |
| 2022 | 65,371 |
| 2023 | 74,434 |
| 2024 | 90,727 |
| 2025 | 81,675 |

== Awards ==
In 2022, the XUV700 achieved the Autocar Car of the Year award and also Indian Car of the Year 2022. The XUV700 also achieved Global NCAP's Safer Choice Award.

== Mahindra XUV 7XO ==
The facelift XUV700, renamed as XUV 7XO was launched on 05 January 2026.
