= Compact crossover SUV =

Second smallest sport utility vehicle size class

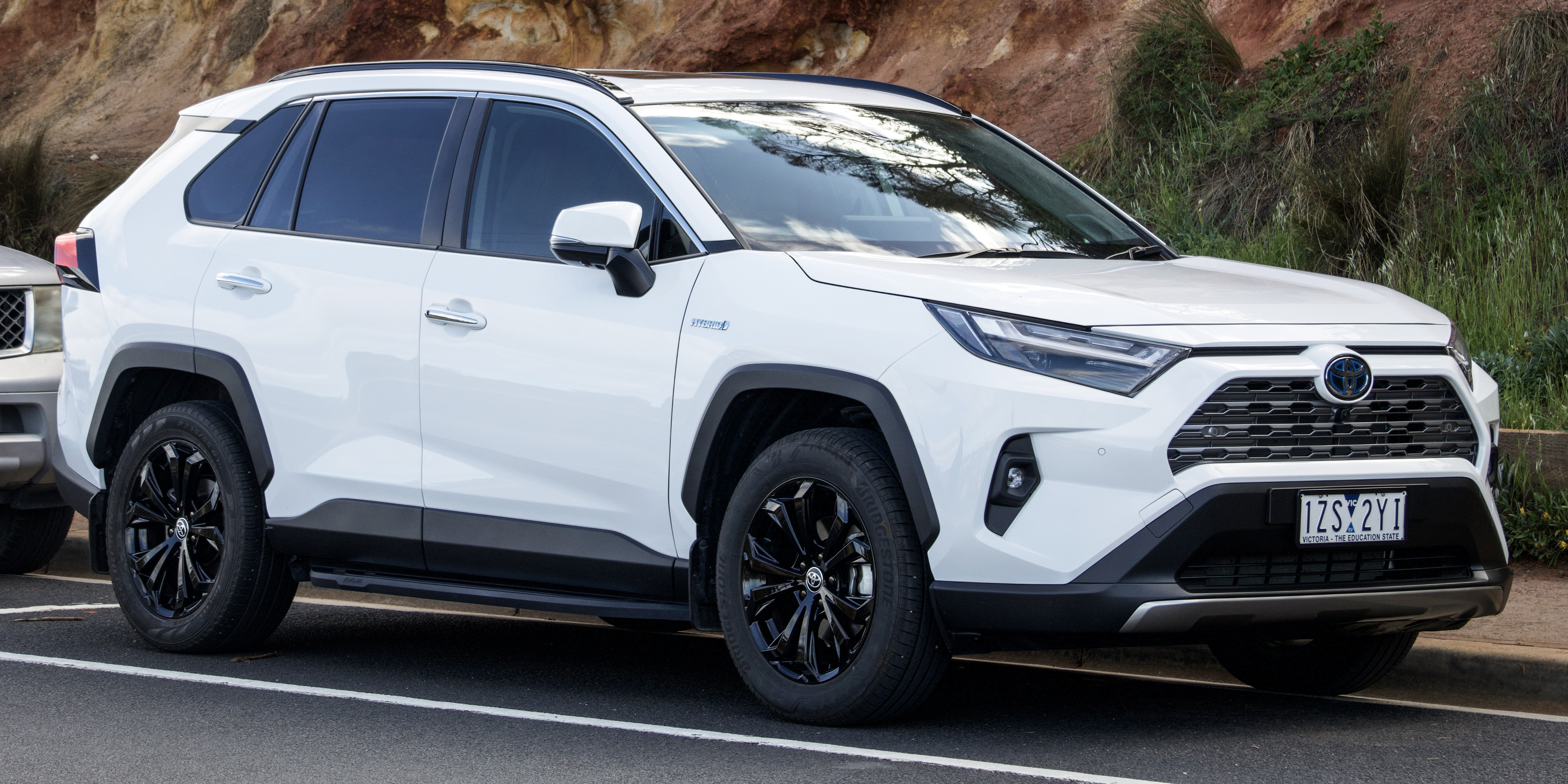
The Toyota RAV4 was the worldwide best-selling compact crossover SUV and the best-selling SUV of any kind in 2020.

Compact crossover SUV is an automobile classification used mainly in North America to describe a segment of crossover SUVs, a type of sport utility vehicle, between subcompact crossover SUV and mid-size crossover SUV.

By the late 2010s, the segment had emerged as the most popular automobile segment in several regions. For example, nearly one in every four cars sold in the United States in 2019 was a compact crossover, at about 24.2 percent.

The best-selling vehicle in the segment in 2020 was the Toyota RAV4, with 995,762 units sold globally. It was also the second best-selling automobile in the world behind the Toyota Corolla in 2021.

== Terminology ==
The term "compact crossover SUV" is most commonly used in North America, where the "compact car" and "crossover" terms originated. It is also known as a C-segment SUV or C-SUV. The naming of the segment also differs depending on the market. In several regions outside North America, the category may be known as "mid-size/medium crossover" or "mid-size/medium SUV", but these vehicles are smaller than vehicles known in the US as mid-size crossover SUVs.

== Characteristics ==
Compact crossovers are usually based on the platform of a compact car (C-segment), while some models may be based on a mid-size car (D-segment) or an enlarged B-segment platform. The majority of models in the compact crossover category have two-row seating, while some offer three-row seating. Vehicles in this segment typically have an exterior length ranging between 4,400 mm (173.2 in) and 4,700 mm (185.0 in).

Due to its popularity and to cater to customer needs, many manufacturers offer more than one compact crossover, usually offering them in slightly different sizes at different price points. American magazine Car and Driver stated "so many of these vehicles are crowding the marketplace, simply sorting through them can be a daunting task".

== Markets ==
=== Australia ===
The segment is commonly known as "medium SUV" in the region. In 2021, it was the second-largest automobile segment in the market after pickup trucks at 180,000 units from 19 different models, which contributed 17.2 percent of total automobile sales in Australia.

The top three sellers in 2021 were the Toyota RAV4, Mazda CX-5 and Mitsubishi Outlander.

Top 3 best-sellers in Australia, 2021

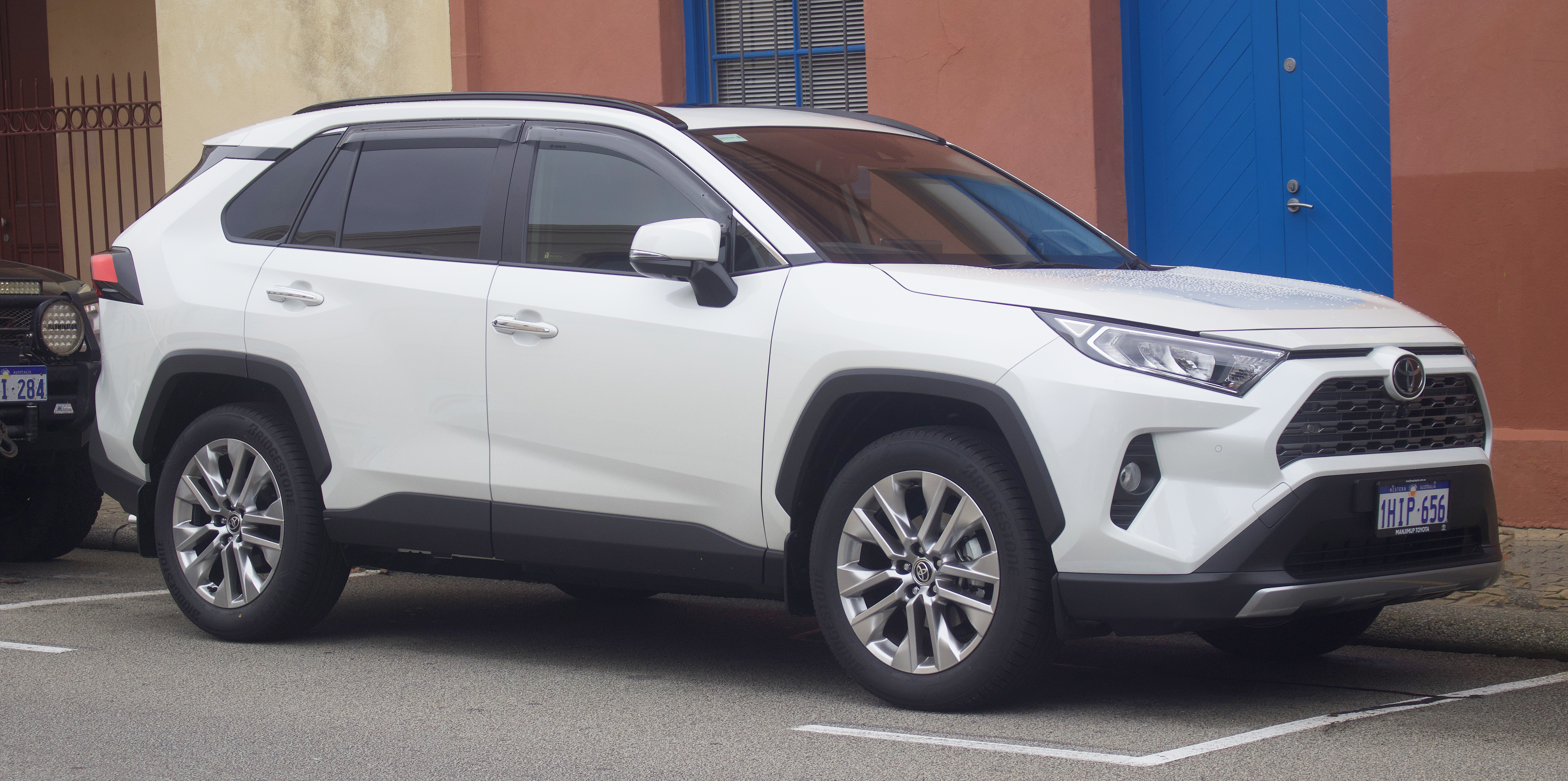
RAV4 (35,751 sold)

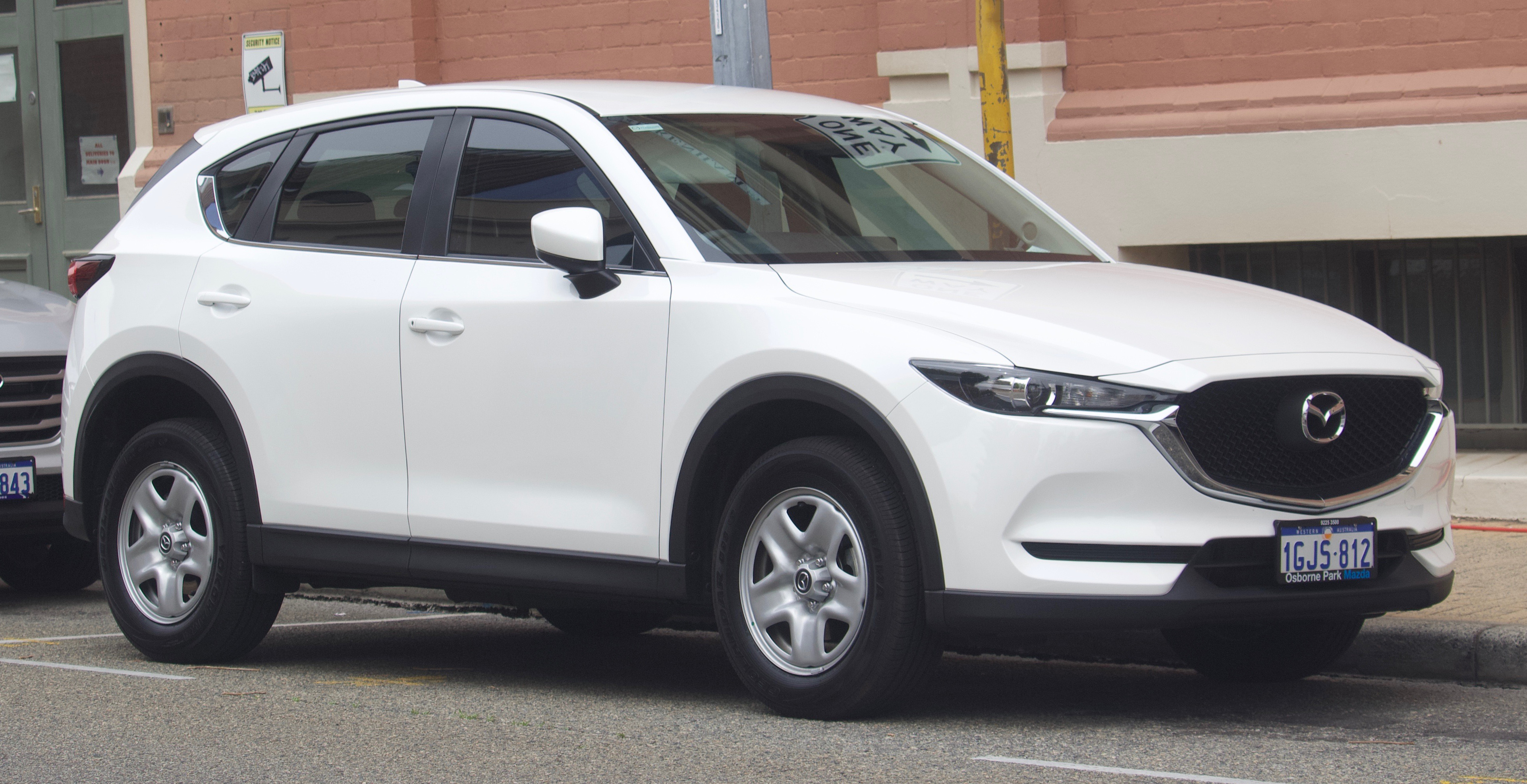
CX-5 (24,968 sold)

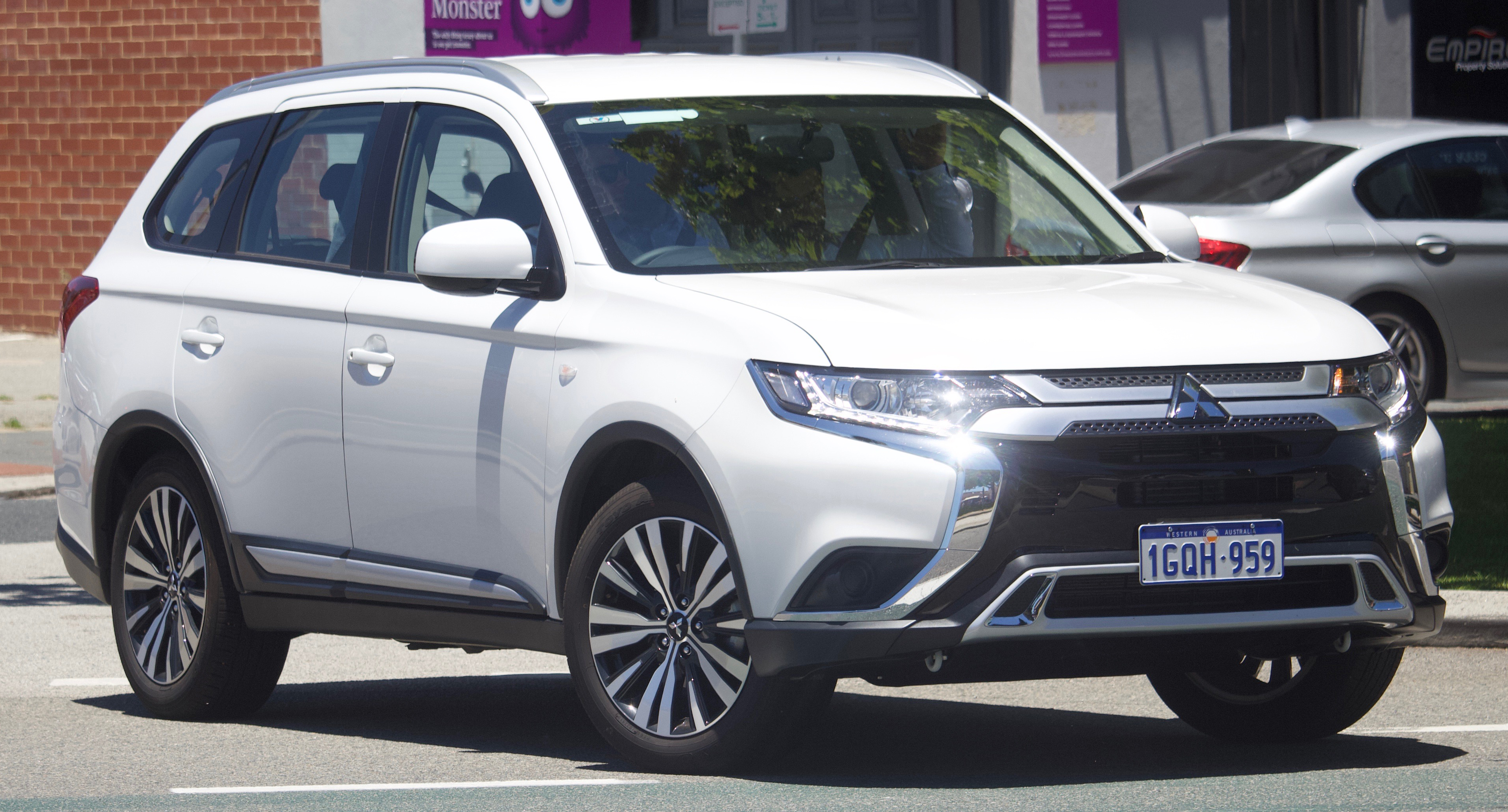
Outlander (14,572 sold)

=== Europe ===
In the European market, several analysts and agencies divided the segment into two, the smaller ones ("compact" or "C-SUV"), and the larger vehicles ("mid-size" or "D-SUV"), with the latter usually longer than 4,500 mm (177.2 in) with some models offering three-row seating. In 2021, the combined segments in Europe recorded 3,055,770 sales according to data from JATO Dynamics, representing 26 percent of the market.

The Nissan Qashqai played a significant role in growing and popularising the segment. Introduced in 2006, at the time it was Nissan's only vehicle in the C-segment space in Europe since the company discontinued the Almera hatchback and saloon. The vehicle was credited with starting the trend for compact crossovers in Europe, with their advantage being high-riding and rugged-looking family cars, while not having the high running costs usually associated with off-roaders. It led the segment since its introduction until 2019, when the Volkswagen Tiguan took its place.

In 2016, two out of three vehicles sold in the segment were produced by Renault–Nissan, Volkswagen Group and Hyundai Motor Group.

The top 3 best-sellers in Europe in 2021 are:

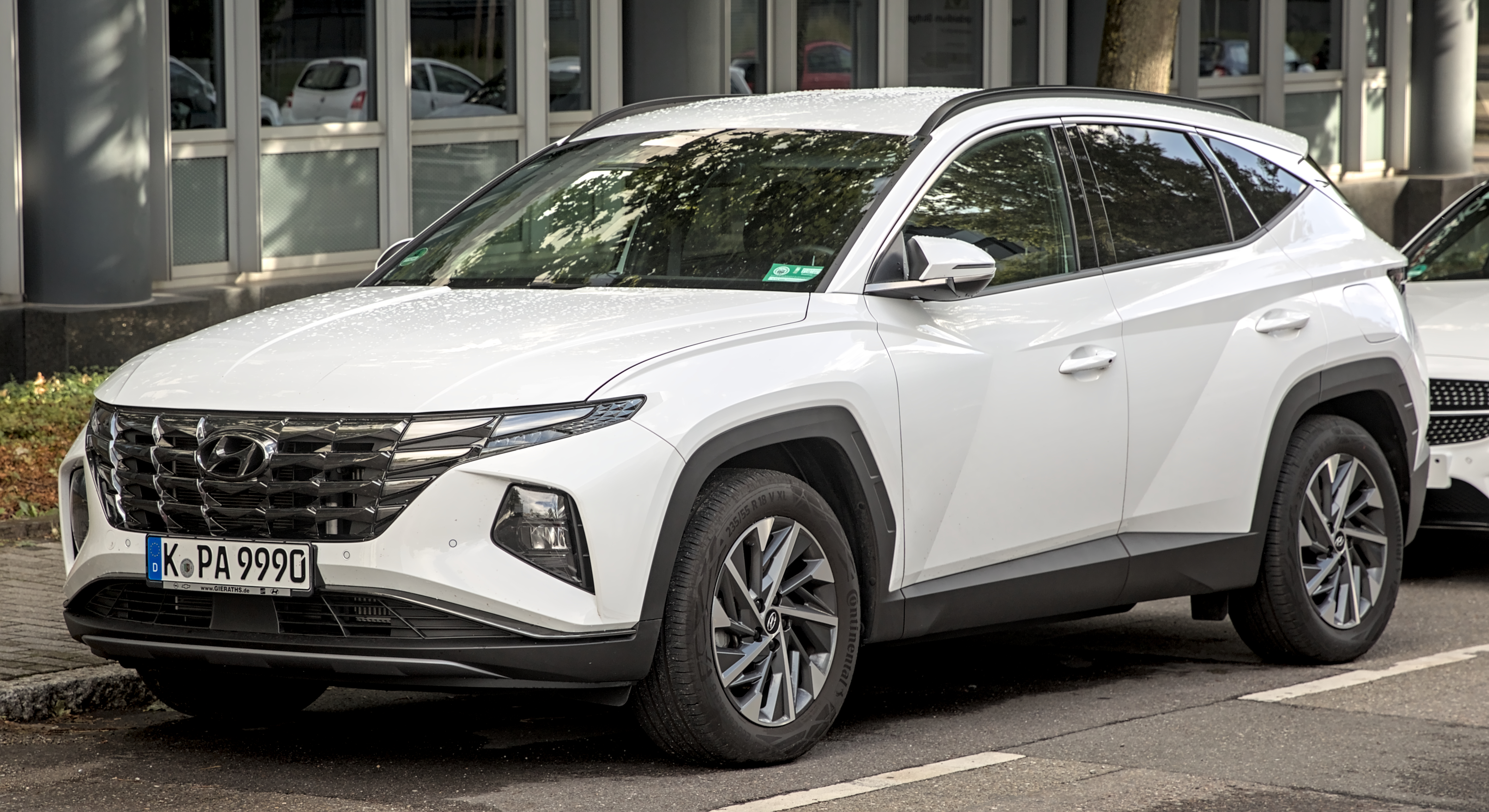
Hyundai Tucson (149,170 sold)

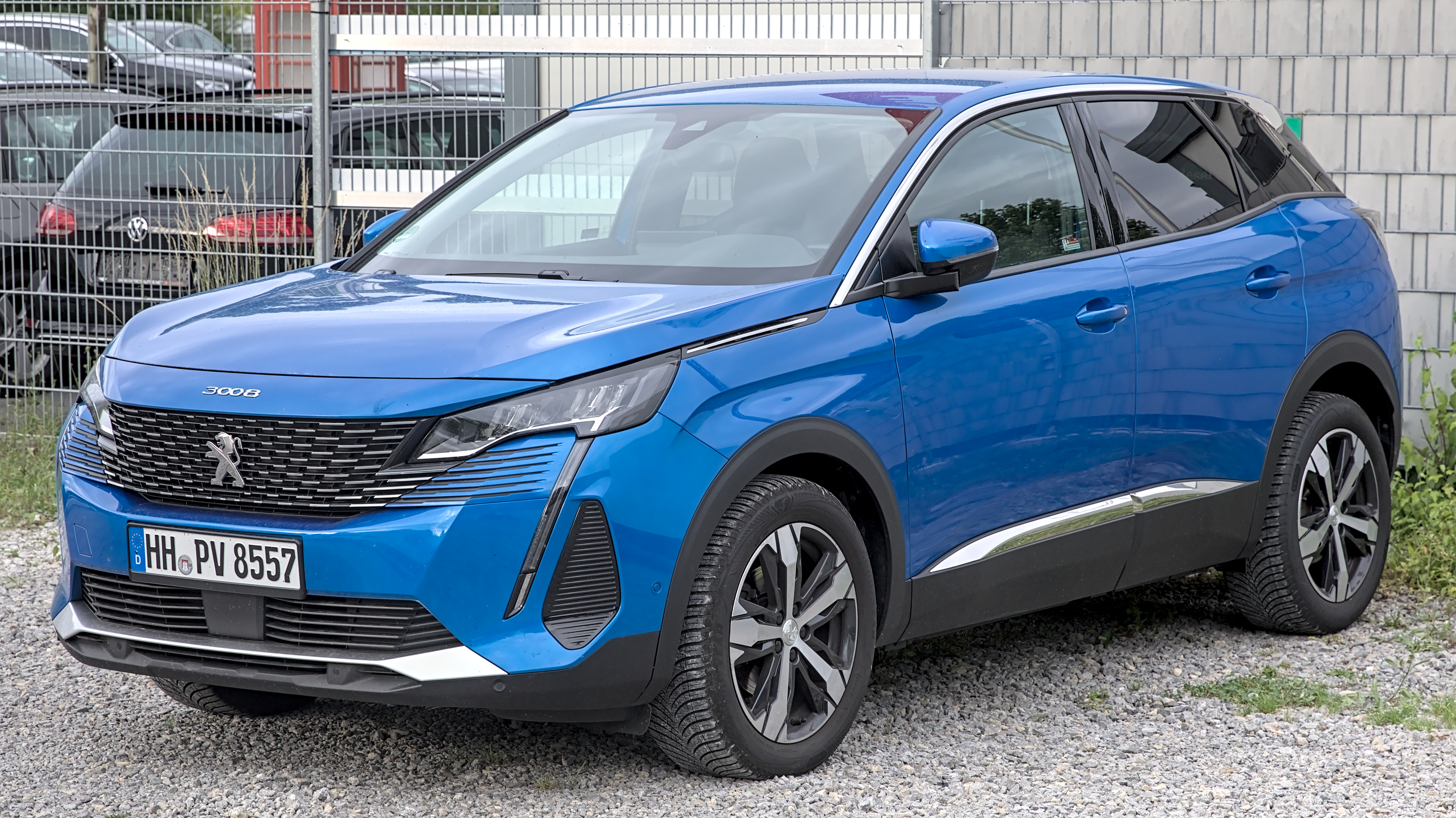
Peugeot 3008 (140,015 sold)

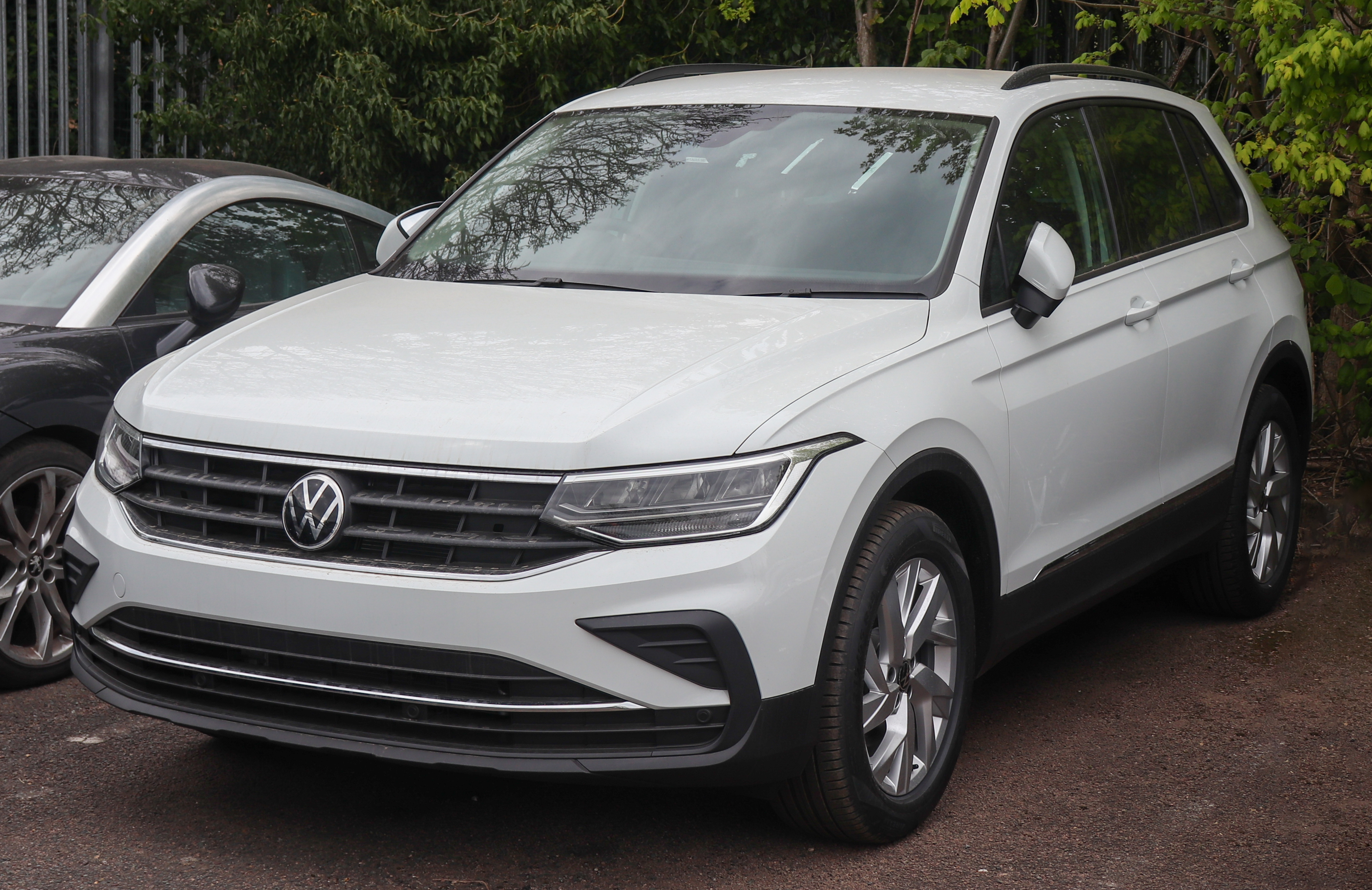
Volkswagen Tiguan (133,558 sold)

=== United States ===
The first compact crossover was the 1980 AMC Eagle that was based on the compact-sized Concord line. Its four-wheel drive system was an almost unheard-of feature on regular passenger cars at the time and it came with full-time all-wheel drive, automatic transmission, power steering, power-assisted front disc brakes standard as well as numerous convenience and comfort options. Later models included the 1994 Toyota RAV4, 1995 Honda CR-V, 1997 Subaru Forester, 2000 Nissan X-Trail, 2000 Mazda Tribute, and the 2001 Ford Escape.

Between 2005 and 2010, the market share of compact crossovers in the US increased from 6 percent to 11.2 percent.

In 2014, for the first time, sales of compact crossovers outpaced mid-size sedans in the United States.

Top 3 best-sellers in the US, 2021

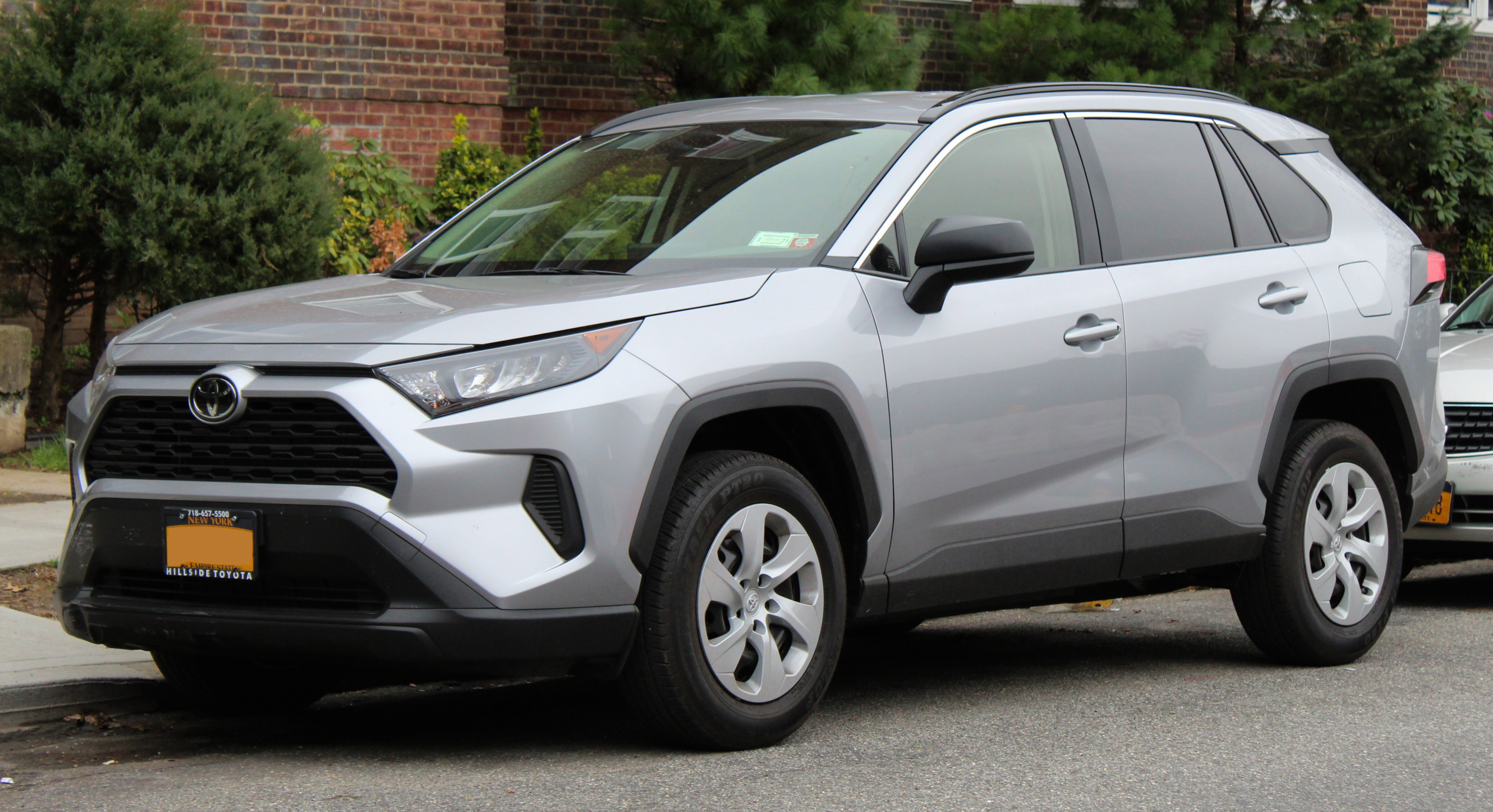
Toyota RAV4 (407,739 sold)

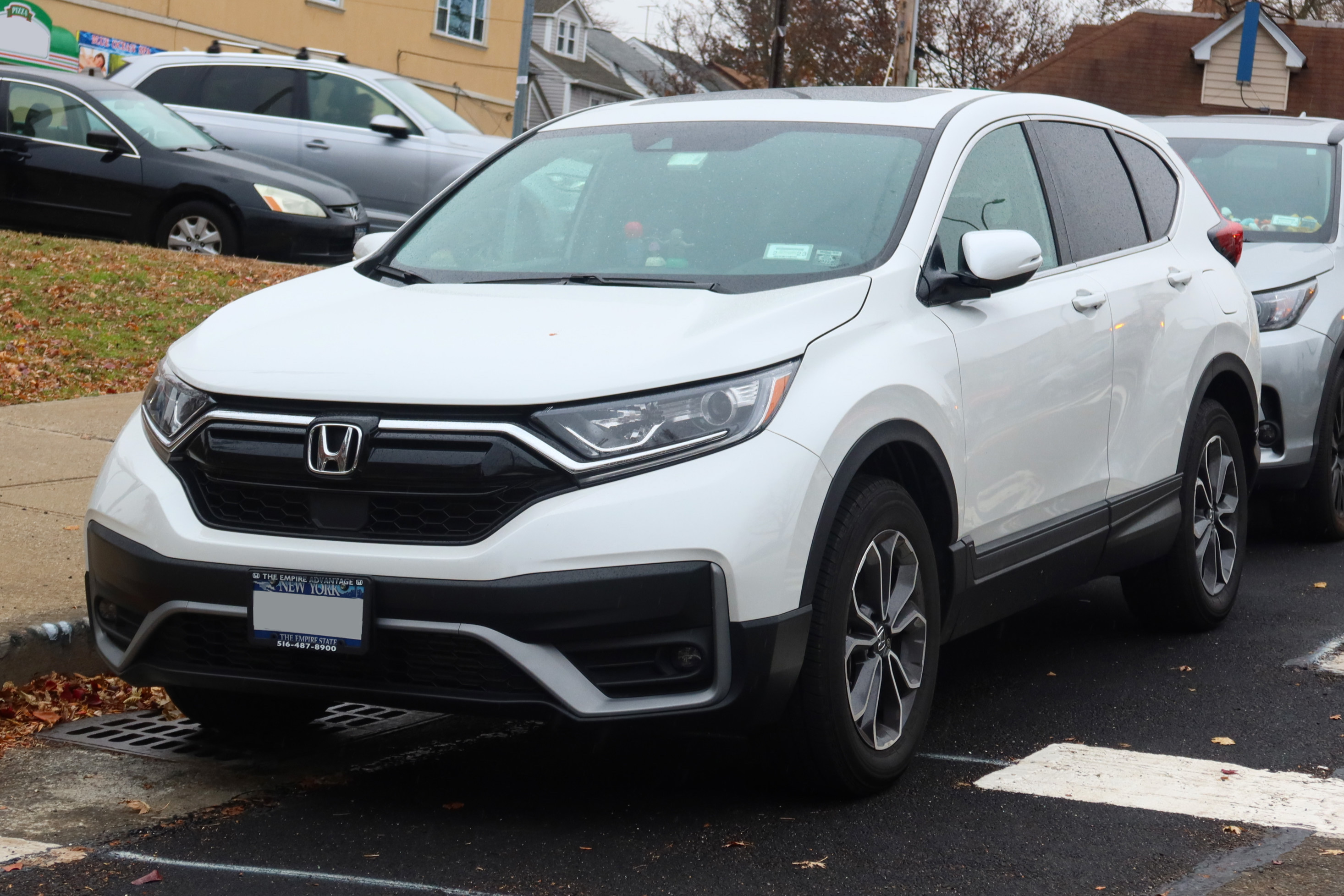
Honda CR-V (361,271 sold)

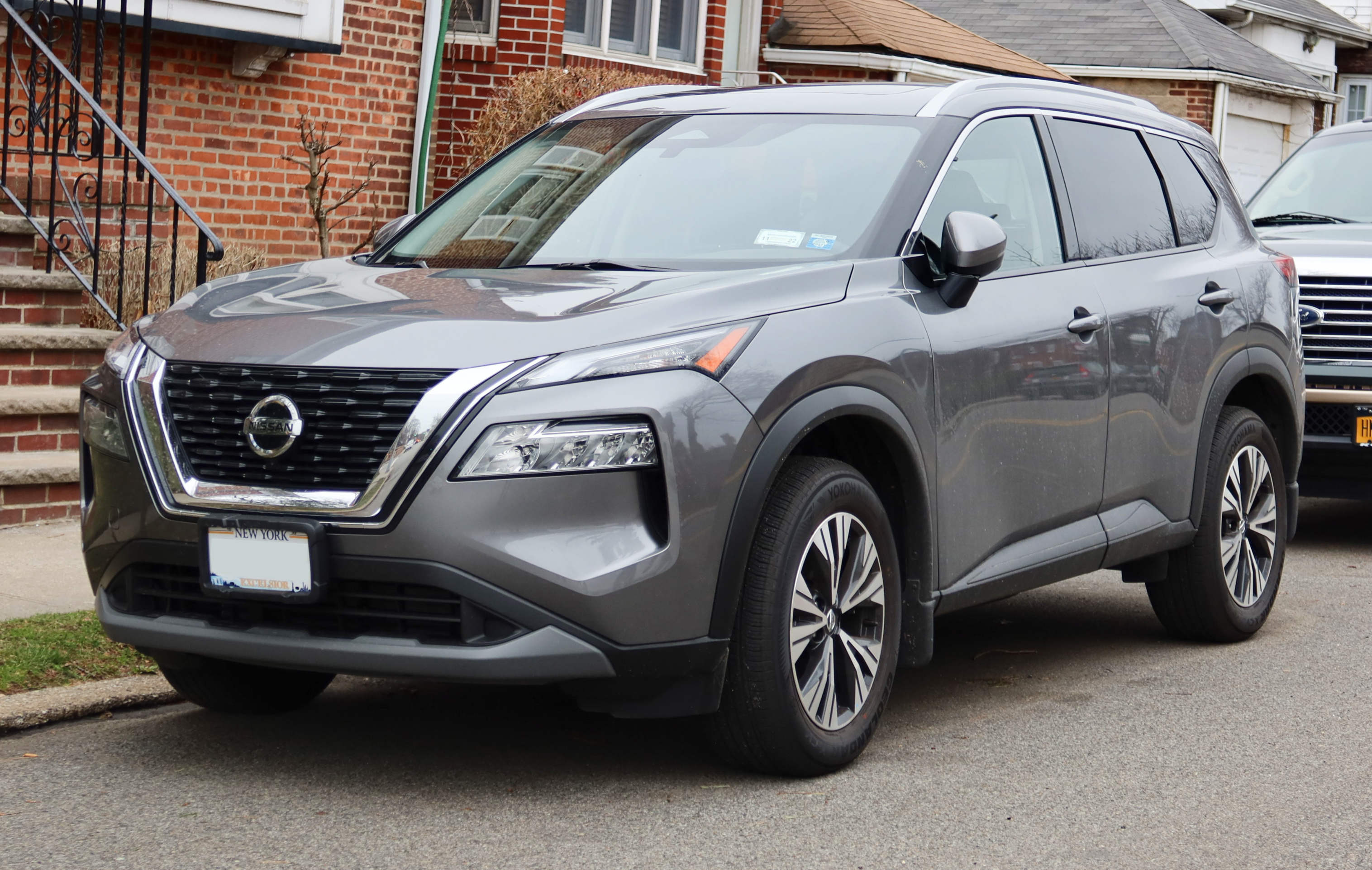
Nissan Rogue (285,602 sold including the Rogue Sport)

== Luxury vehicles ==
Numerous luxury vehicle brands marketed compact crossover SUVs, usually as an entry-level SUV offering of the respective brands. It is known by many terms such as compact luxury crossover SUV, luxury compact SUV, premium small SUV, premium compact crossover, luxury small SUV, among others. Compact luxury crossover SUVs are usually based on the platform of a mid-size car (D-segment), while some models may be based on a full-size car (E-segment) or a C-segment platform.

Vehicles in this segment are commonly built on a D-segment car platform or above. While being significantly more expensive, vehicles from this segment offer similar driving and convenience advantages as mainstream compact crossover SUVs, with larger exterior dimensions, more refined interiors, more advanced technologies, higher engine power and added prestige.

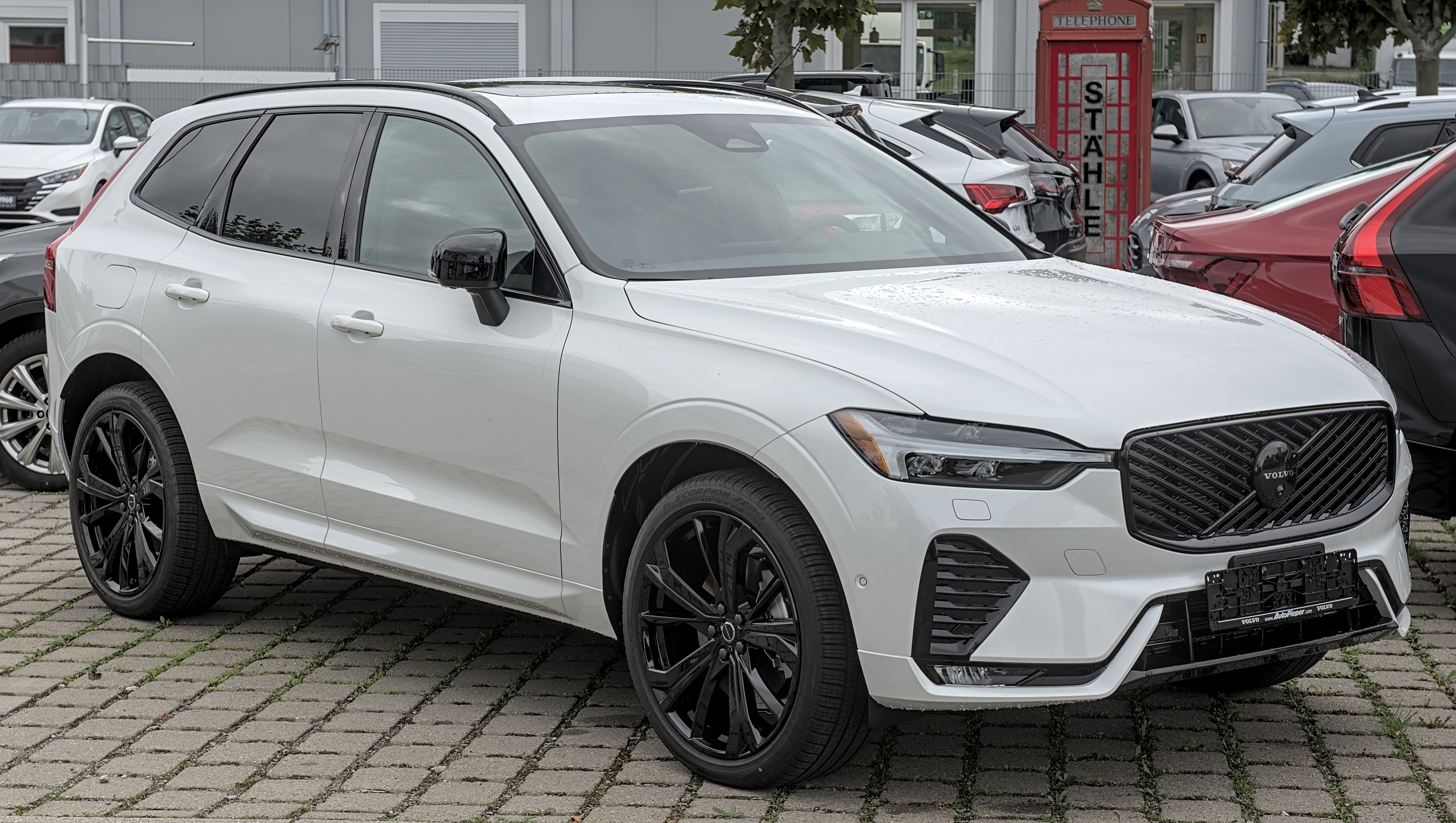
Volvo XC60, in between the Volvo XC40 and Volvo XC90

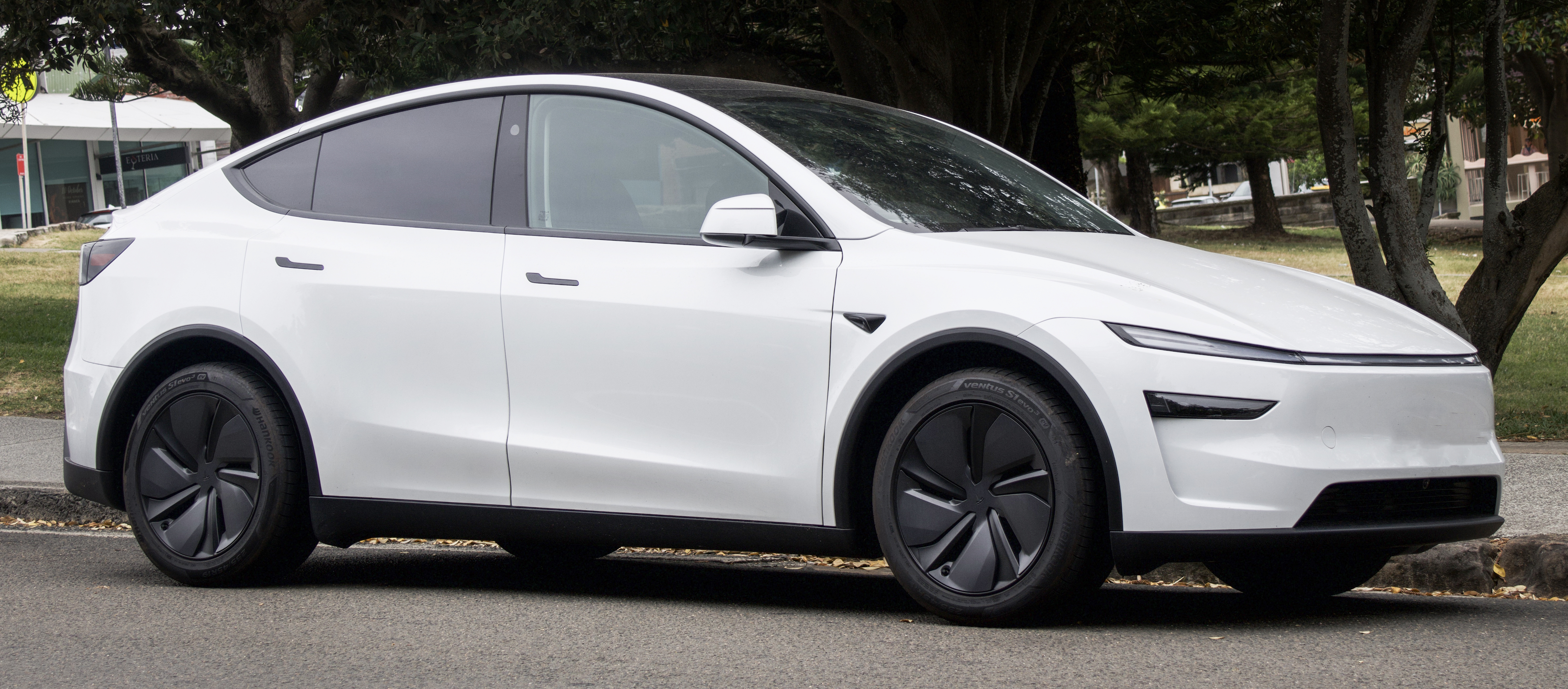
The Tesla Model Y, battery-electric compact luxury crossover

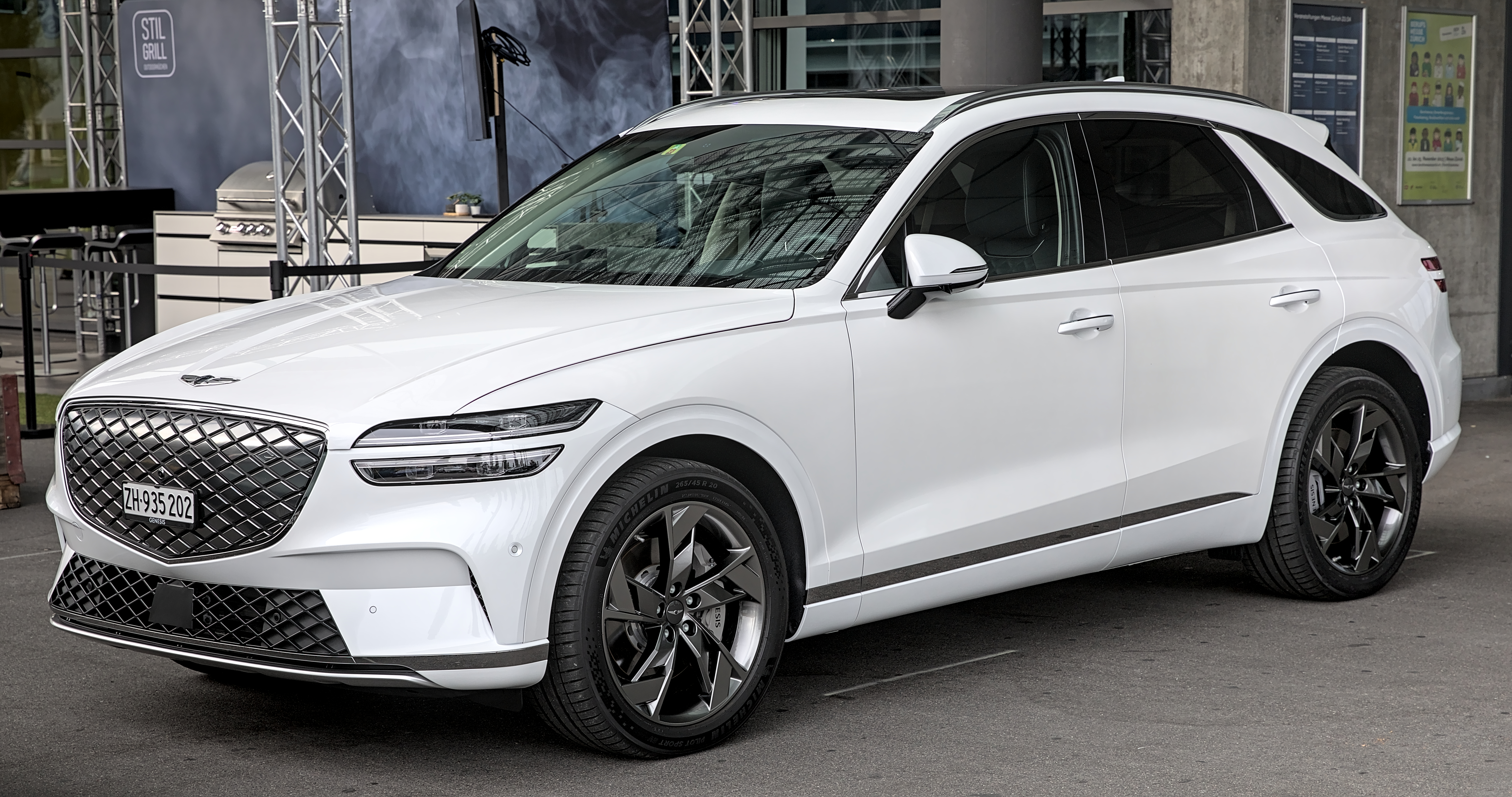
The Genesis GV70 is positioned between the GV60 and GV80

== See also ==
- Crossover (automobile)
- Compact car
- C-segment
- Sport utility vehicle
- Car classification
