= Roxor =

Roxor can mean any of the following:

- Roxor Games
- Mahindra Roxor - 4x4 offroad vehicle
