= 2021 Lakhimpur Kheri violence =

2021 killing in Uttar Pradesh, India

Lakhimpur Kheri incident
- Part of 2020–2021 Indian farmers' protest
- Date: 3 October 2021
- Location: Banbirpur near Tikunia, Lakhimpur Kheri district, Uttar Pradesh, India; 28.395°N 80.976°E
- Methods: Vehicle-ramming attack, drive-by shooting, lynching

Parties
Samyukt Kisan Morcha	Bharatiya Janata Party	Others

Lead figures
Tajinder Singh Virk	Ashish Mishra Teni	–

Casualties and losses
Deaths: 4 Injuries: 10; Arrests: 2	Deaths: 2 Arrests: 13	Deaths: 2 (car driver, journalist)

Deaths
- Deaths: 8
- Injuries: 10
- Arrested: 13

The Lakhimpur Kheri incident (Note: Sources calling the incident a massacre) was a sequence of violent incidents comprising a vehicle-ramming attack, drive-by shooting and a mob lynching all on 3 October 2021 at Banbirpur village near Tikunia in Lakhimpur Kheri district, Uttar Pradesh, India. They occurred during farmers’ protests against three agricultural laws passed in 2020 by the Bharatiya Janata Party (BJP) led Union Government. The violence led to the deaths of eight people and injuries to ten others. Four protesting farmers and a journalist were run over by a car. Two BJP members and MP Ajay Mishra Teni's driver were lynched by protestors in the aftermath.

== Background ==
The 2020–2021 Indian farmers' protest were a series of protest against three farm acts which were passed by the Union Government of India in the BJP controlled Parliament of India in September 2020.

In September 2021, Ajay Mishra Teni, a BJP leader and Minister of State for Home Affairs was attending an event in Palia town of Lakhimpur Kheri district. During the event, the farmer union members had shown black flags as a sign of protest. Teni warned the protesting farmer union members in his speech saying, "Sudhar jao, nahi toh hum sudhaar denge, do minute me" (transl. You better reform, or we will reform you in two minutes.) Tajinder Singh Virk, a farmer leader who is also linked to the Samajwadi Party, later organised a protest against Teni's upcoming visit, in response to this warning. On 3 October, Minister Teni and Keshav Prasad Maurya had planned to attend an event in the area. Maurya is the Deputy Chief Minister of Uttar Pradesh.

== Incident ==
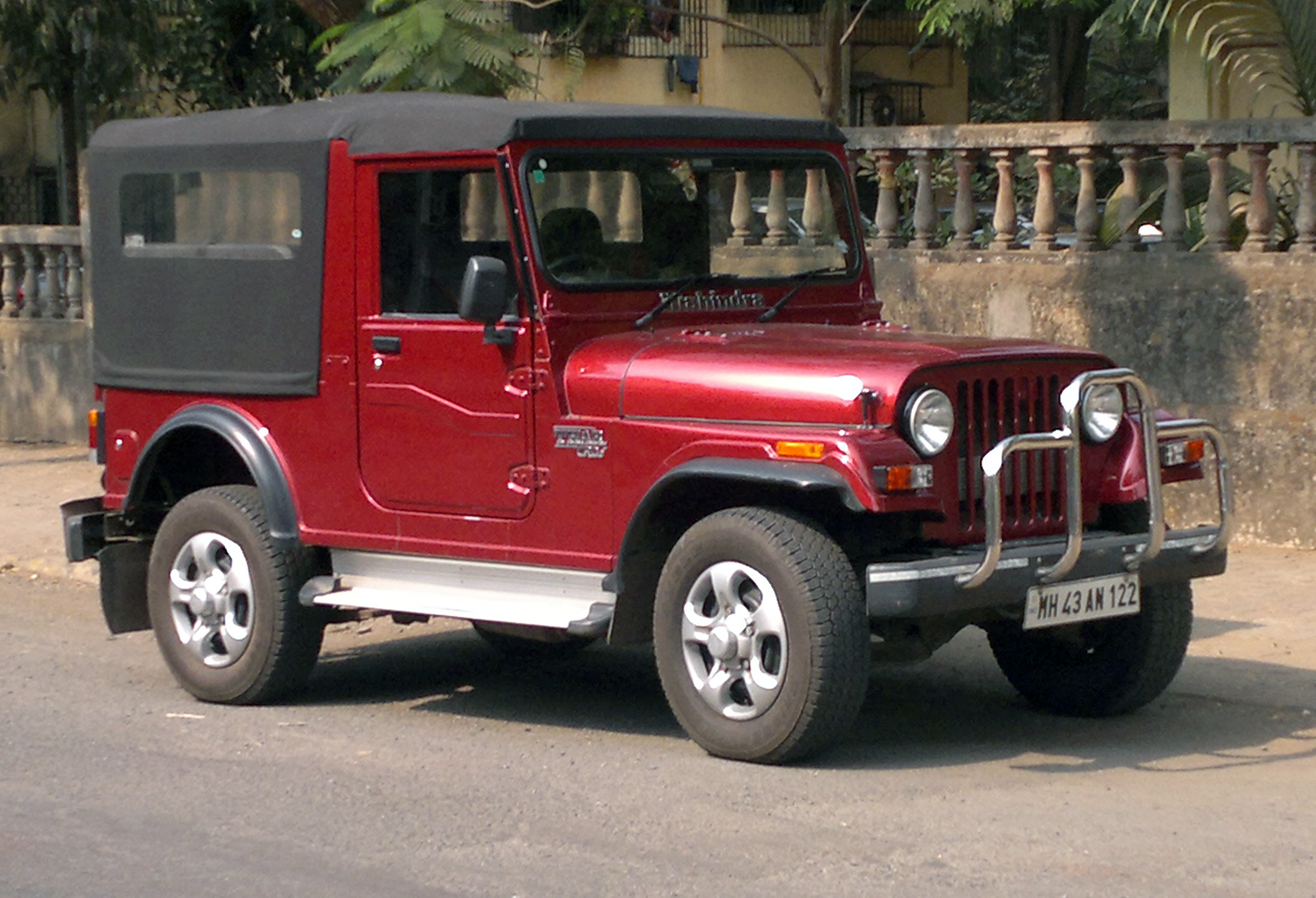
Representative picture of a Mahindra Thar SUV, the same model involved in the vehicle-ramming attack.

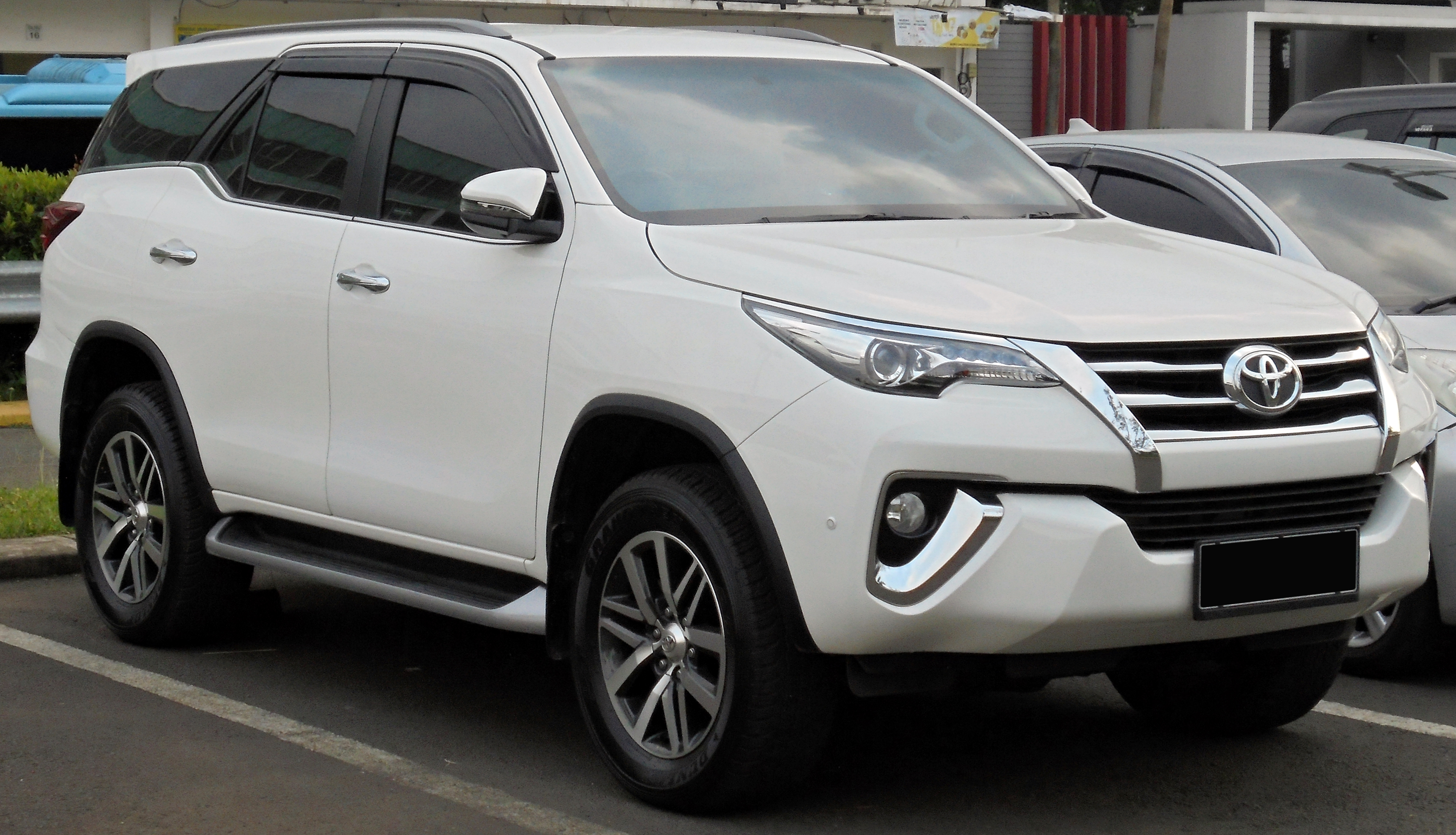
Representative picture of a second car, a Toyota Fortuner that was part of the convoy behind the Thar.

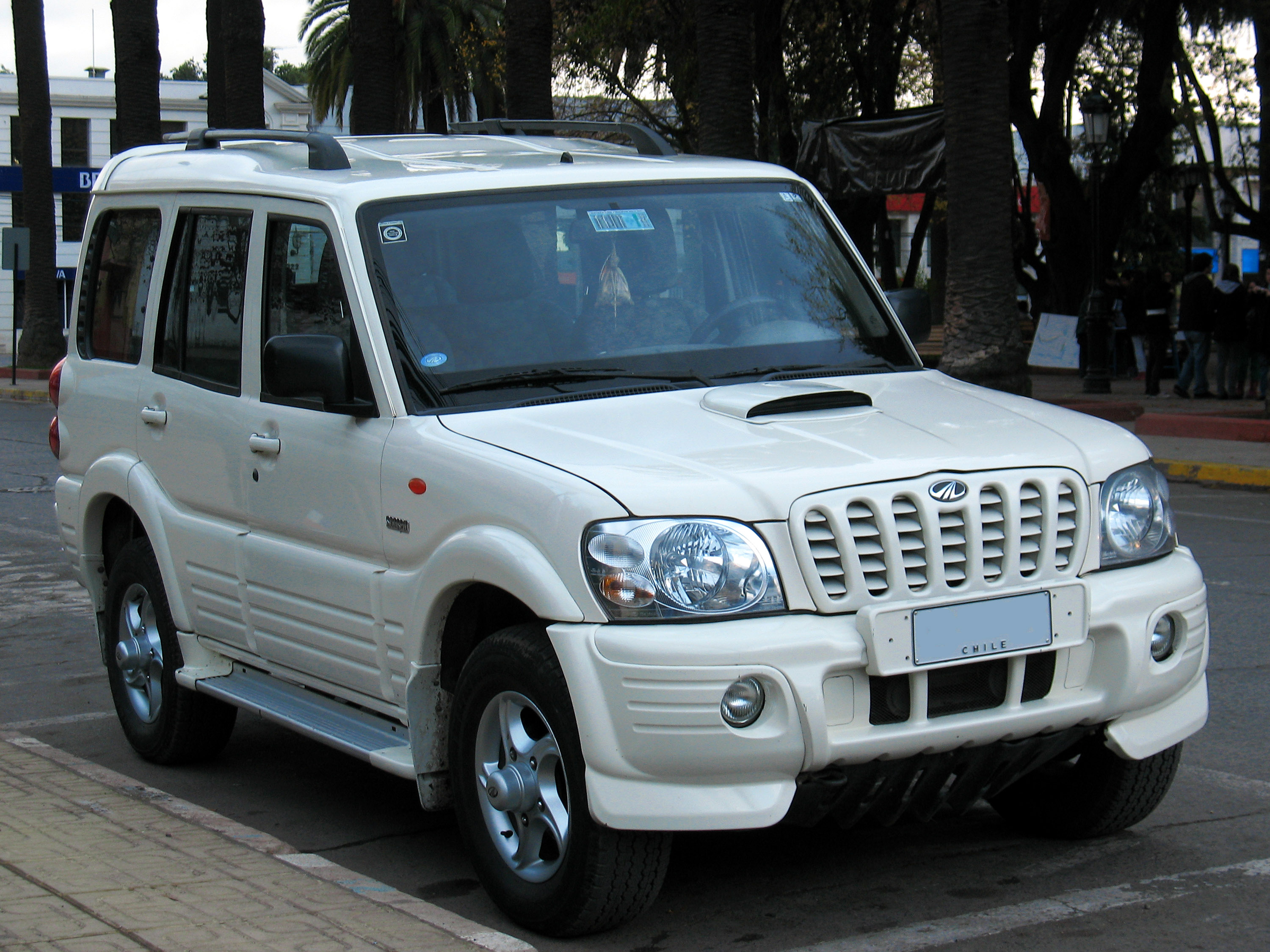
Representative picture of a Mahindra Scorpio, the third car in the convoy.

On 3 October 2021, hundreds of farmers in the Tikonia area of Lakhimpur Kheri district were returning after staging protests as part of the 2020–2021 Indian farmers' protests against the 2020 Indian agriculture acts. The protestors were blocking state deputy chief minister Maurya's visit to Banbirpur village. Protestors walking on the road were hit and ran over from behind by a speeding Mahindra Thar, a sport utility vehicle (SUV). Two other vehicles in the convoy quickly followed the first car and ran over the injured people on the ground. According to witnesses, gunshots were also fired. (Note: Sources covering the firearms shooting.) Protesters torched the Thar and Toyota Fortuner cars and killed three of their occupants, while the driver of the third car in the convoy, a Mahindra Scorpio, fled the site with his car.

Eight people died in the violence. Two farmers died on the spot while two more died later in the hospital. Ten farmers were injured. Raman Kashyap, a 28-year-old journalist working with the private TV news channel was among those killed. According to his father and brother, Kashyap was hit by the car and grievously injured. Three persons in the minister's convoy (the driver of Ajay Mishra Teni and two BJP workers) were lynched by the farmers, two of the three died.

Two of the cars involved were owned by Union Minister Teni. According to eyewitnesses, the minister's son, Ashish Teni, was in one of the cars.

== Investigation ==
Two first information reports (FIR) on the incidents were filed at the Tikunia police station. The complainant alleged that the event was 'premeditated' and that a "conspiracy was hatched by the minister" (Ajay Teni) and his son. Ashish Teni, along with around 20 unnamed men, were charged. The charges listed in the FIR were Indian Penal Code sections 147, 148, 149 (all three related to rioting), 279 (rash driving), 338 (causes grievous hurt to any person by doing any act so rashly or negligently as to endanger human life), 304A (causing death by negligence), 302 (murder), and 120B (party to a criminal conspiracy) Ashish Teni was allegedly driving the car involved in the incidents. He denied the charge and evaded police questioning for six days.

The Supreme Court of India heard the case after two lawyers from Uttar Pradesh wrote to Chief Justice N. V. Ramana, seeking a federal investigation into the incidents. The Supreme Court criticised the Uttar Pradesh government and expressed dissatisfaction over the initial steps taken. The court also asked the police why the minister's son had not been arrested when he was accused of a serious crime of murder. Chief Justice Ramana, speaking for the court, disapproved of the staffing of the Special Investigation Team (SIT) set up by the Government of Uttar Pradesh stating "the people in the commission, they're all local officers".

Ashish Mishra Teni appeared for questioning before the SIT six days after the incidents. He was arrested and taken into custody on 9 October 2021. Three more people were also arrested. On 12 October, he was taken to the violence site for reconstruction of the events.

The forensic team of the investigators recovered two empty .315 firearm cartridges from Ashish Teni's vehicle at the incident site. A forensic examination of the cartridges was sought. The presence of empty cartridges in his vehicle could not be explained by Teni. He was accused of shooting at the farmers.

On 15 October, four firearms, including a rifle belonging to Ashish Mishra Teni were recovered by the Uttar Pradesh Police. Among the weapons were a pistol owned by a nephew of a former Union minister and a repeater gun, held by the bodyguard of the nephew. A revolver was also recovered. Forensic tests conducted at the Forensic Science Laboratory (FSL) on the firearms confirmed that they had been fired, but the report did not confirm if they were fired on the day of the incidents. Of the 20 people accused in the police report, police have arrested 13.

Journalist Raman Kashyap was in Tikunia to cover the rally but was shot and killed. His brother Pawan Kashyap stated that the SIT investigation had found that his brother was crushed to death by a car and not lynched by farmers. Pawan filed a complaint with the police but no FIR was registered by the police. Pawan moved the court for instructions to the police to press charges over Kashyap's death against 14 people, including Minister Teni and his son. The complaint stated "As per eyewitnesses, the journalist was shot at while he was covering the car. Gunshots can be heard in the footage as well".

On 15 November 2021, the Supreme Court directed Uttar Pradesh government to "upgrade" the SIT with more senior police officers and include a retired judge "to ensure proper investigation".

On 25 November 2021 the new SIT, consisting of S B Shiradkar Additional Director General of Police (ADGP) of Uttar Pradesh, Police intelligence; Padmaja Chauhan, Inspector General of Police (IG), recruitment board; and Preetinder Singh, posted as Deputy Inspector General of Police (DIG), all visited the crime scene in Tikunia and met, amongst others, with Upendra Agarwal (DIG) the former head of the SIT. The three IPS officers, were accompanied by Rakesh Kumar Jain, retired judge of Punjab and Haryana High Court, who had been appointed by Chief Justice NV Ramana to "ensure impartiality and independence of the investigation."

On 15 December, Senior Prosecution Officer (SPO) S P Yadav told the media that the Chief Investigator of the SIT Vidyaram Diwakar (Inspector Crime Branch, Kheri), had moved an application in the court of Chief Judicial Magistrate Chinta Ram. In the application the investigator has stated that causing death by ramming a vehicle into the farmers was "not an act of negligence or carelessness." but "a pre-planned conspiracy". In the application he recommended that the earlier IPC sections in the FIR; sections 279 (Rash driving or riding on a public way), 338 (Whoever causes grievous hurt to any person by doing any act so rashly or negligently) and 304A (Causing death by negligence) be replaced with IPC sections 307 (Attempt to murder), 326 (Voluntarily causing grievous hurt by dangerous weapons), 34 (Acts done by several persons in furtherance of common intention), and sections 3/25/30 of the Arms Act.

On 3 January 2022 The SIT filed a 5,000 page charge-sheet against 14 people, including Union Minister Teni’s son Ashish, who has been named the main accused. The charge-sheet was submitted in the court of Chief Judicial Magistrate Chinta Ram. In addition to Ashish Teni the charge-sheet named Ankit Das, Nandan Singh Bisht, Satyam Tripathi, alias Satyam, Latif, alias Kale, Shekhar Bharti, Sumit Jaiswal, Ashish Pandey, Lavkush Rana, Shishu Pal, Ullas Kumar, alias Mohit Trivedi, Rinku Rana and Dharmendra Banjara. In addition to these names Virendra Shukla’s name has been added in the charge sheet under IPC Section 201 (causing disappearance of evidence). The court accepted the charge sheet and fixed 10 January as the next date of hearing.

== Aftermath ==
An alleged video of the incident shared by BJP parliamentarian Varun Gandhi showed a vehicle ramming unarmed protesters from behind.

On 9 October, the farmer unions termed the violence an "act of terror" that was part of a larger conspiracy to break the ten-month-old farmers' protest. The union stated, this "massacre" during the farmer's movement was analogous to the Jallianwala Bagh massacre in 1919 during the Indian independence movement. The unions and the Samyukt Kisan Morcha (SKM) farmer union coalition planned several protests calling for the immediate dismissal and arrest of Union Minister Ajay Mishra Teni and his son Ashish. Rashtriya Lok Dal party president Jayant Chaudhary, called the incident "not less than a terror attack". Opposition parties held protest meetings against the violence at Lakhimpur Kheri. Canadian MP Sukh Dhaliwal, shaken by the video, called it a terror attack no different to the London, Ontario truck attack.

The Editors Guild of India (EGI) demanded a probe by a court-led special investigative team on the death of the journalist and asked the media to report facts. The EGI stated, "In what is clearly a terror attack meant to spread fear amongst the farmers, the killing of Kashyap raises many questions. The Editors Guild demands that the death of Kashyap be separately probed by a Court-led special investigation team to ascertain the circumstances of his death and also attempt to recover and use the footage of his camera to build the sequence of events leading to his death. EGI is concerned about the varying versions of the incident in different sections of the media. It is imperative for the media to report the facts and not versions."

=== Calls for removal of Teni from Home ministry post ===
On 26 November 2021 the Delhi Legislative Assembly passed a resolution demanding the sacking of Ajay Mishra Teni from his post of Minister of State.
