= Barsola Kalan =

- village
- Location in Uttar Pradesh, India Barsola Kalan (India)
- Coordinates: 28.373806°N 80.999437°E
- Country: India
- State: Uttar Pradesh
- District: Kheri

Languages
  - Official: Hindi
- Time zone: UTC+5:30 (IST)
- Postal code: 262906

Barsola Kalan is a village located in Nighasan Tahsil of Lakhimpur Kheri district in the Indian state of Uttar Pradesh.

== Geography ==
Barsola Kalan is very close to the boundary of Nepal, and residents have easy access to Nepal. Barsola Kalan (Tikunia) is 188 km. from the state capital Lucknow and 84.4 km from Lakhimpur Kheri. Barsola Kalan can be reached by road following State Highway 21 (SH21). Nearest railway station is Tikunia railway station and village can be easily reached by train (meter gauge) or UPSRTC Bus services.

Barsola Kalan is one of the villages in Tikunia, which is further divided into chotta Barsola and bada Barsola.
