= Mahindra Scorpio-N =

Second generation of the Mahindra Scorpio SUV

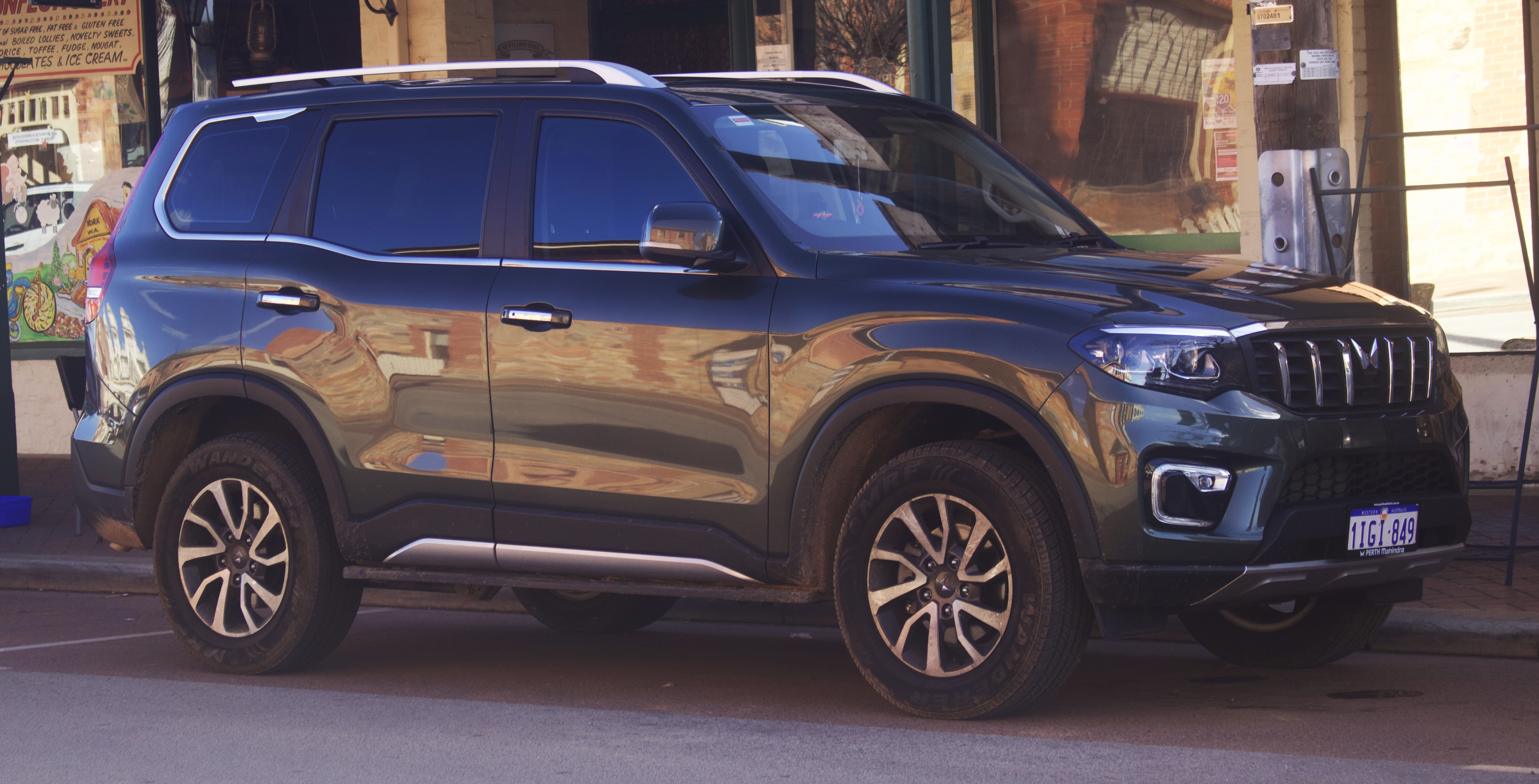

Overview
- Manufacturer: Mahindra & Mahindra
- Model code: Z101
- Production: 2022–present
- Assembly: Nashik, Maharashtra, India

Body and chassis
- Class: Mid-size SUV
- Body style: 5-door SUV
- Layout: Front-engine, rear-wheel-drive Front-engine, four-wheel-drive
- Platform: Third-generation ladder-frame ("W" platform)
- Related: Mahindra Scorpio; Mahindra Thar; Mahindra Thar ROXX

Powertrain
- Engine: 2.0 L mStallion turbocharged petrol I4; 2.2 L mHawk turbocharged diesel I4 (low and high output)
- Transmission: 6-speed manual / 6-speed automatic (torque converter)

Dimensions
- Wheelbase: 108.3 in (2,751 mm)
- Length: 183.5 in (4,661 mm)
- Width: 75.4 in (1,915 mm)
- Height: 72.9 in (1,852 mm) (R17); 73.1 in (1,857 mm) (R18)
- Curb weight: 1,825–2,070 kg

Chronology
- Predecessor: Mahindra Scorpio

The Mahindra Scorpio-N is a mid-size SUV manufactured by Mahindra & Mahindra since 2022. It is the second generation of the Mahindra Scorpio line and was launched in India on 27 June 2022. The model Z101 was developed as a complete redesign with a new chassis, powertrains, and safety systems.

The Z101 Scorpio-N is built on Mahindra's third-generation ladder-frame platform and continues to use a body-on-frame construction. It was developed by the Mahindra India Design Studio in Mumbai in collaboration with Pininfarina (Italy), Mahindra Research Valley (Chennai), and the Mahindra North American Technical Centre (MANA).

In August 2026, Mahindra launched the facelifted Scorpio-N starting at ₹13.69 lakh (ex-showroom). The update introduced key feature additions, including a panoramic sunroof, a 12.3-inch touchscreen infotainment system, a 10.25-inch digital instrument cluster, a 540-degree surround-view camera, and new 18-inch dual-tone alloy wheels, while retaining the existing engine options.

== Overview ==
The Scorpio-N replaced the previous-generation Scorpio in most markets, while the outgoing version continues as the Scorpio Classic. It was designed to combine off-road capability with improved comfort and on-road performance. Production takes place at Mahindra's Nashik plant in Maharashtra, India.

The vehicle is available in multiple seating configurations and drive layouts, including rear-wheel drive and four-wheel drive. It is positioned between the Mahindra Scorpio Classic and the Mahindra XUV700 in Mahindra's SUV range.

== Design ==
=== Exterior ===
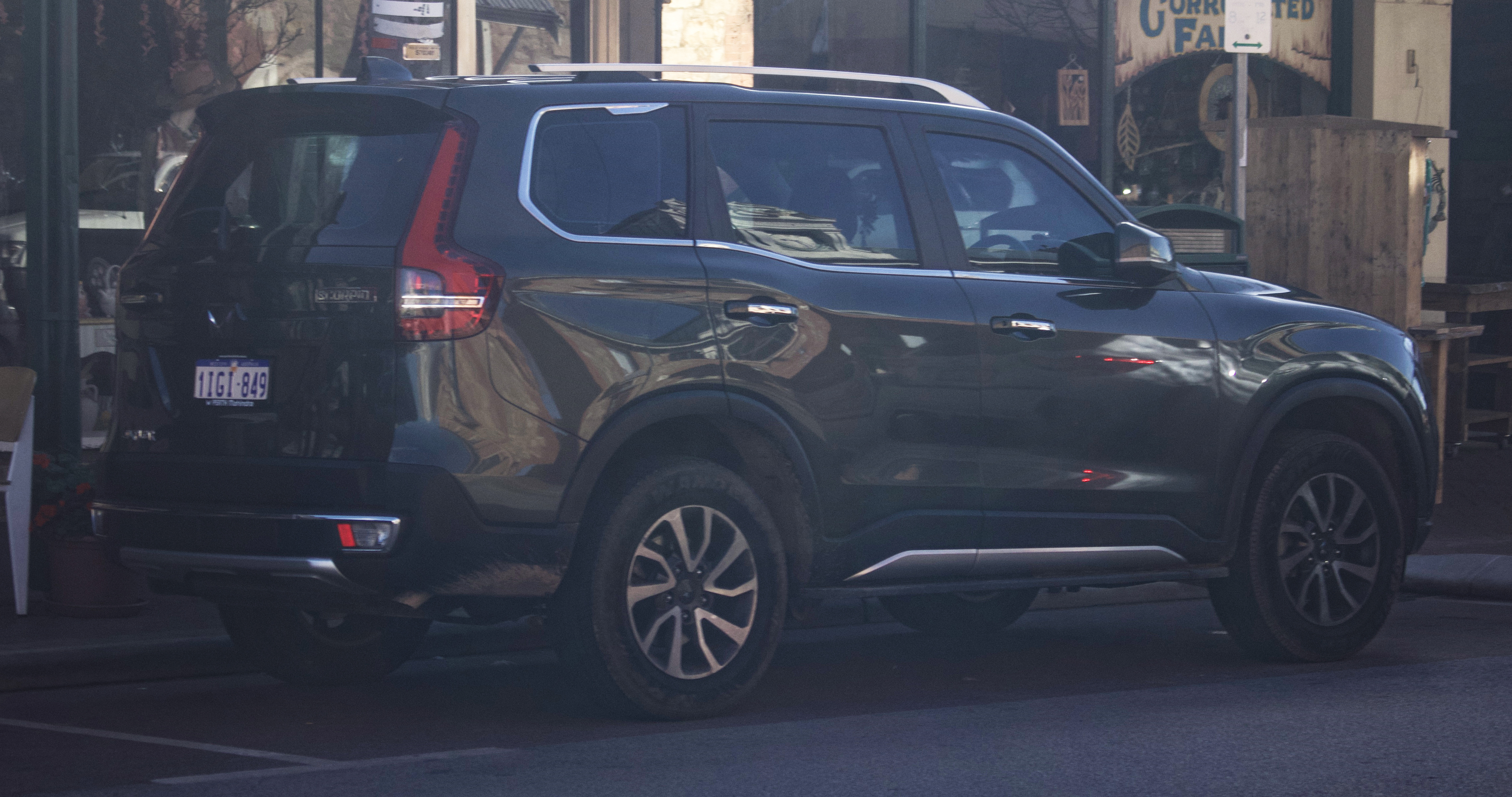
Backside view of the car

The Scorpio-N retains a tall SUV stance with an upright profile. Design features include a six-slat front grille with the Twin Peaks logo, LED projector headlamps, daytime running lights, and vertically stacked LED tail lamps. Alloy wheels of 17 or 18 inches are available depending on the variant.

Specification	Measurement
Length	4,662 mm (184 in)
Width	1,917 mm (75 in)
Height	1,857–1,870 mm (73–74 in)
Wheelbase	2,750 mm (108 in)
Ground clearance	Approx. 200 mm (8 in)

=== Interior ===
The cabin uses a black-and-brown colour theme with fabric or leatherette upholstery depending on variant. The dashboard incorporates soft-touch materials and metallic accents. Seating options include six-seat (with captain chairs) and seven-seat configurations.

== Powertrain ==
The Scorpio-N is available with petrol and diesel engines shared with other Mahindra SUVs.

Engine	Displacement	Power	Torque	Transmission	Drive type
mStallion turbo-petrol	2.0 L	200 hp (149 kW)	370–380 N⋅m (273–280 lb⋅ft)	6-speed manual or 6-speed automatic	RWD
mHawk turbo-diesel (low-tune)	2.2 L	130 hp (97 kW)	300 N⋅m (221 lb⋅ft)	6-speed manual	RWD
mHawk turbo-diesel (high-tune)	2.2 L	172 hp (128 kW)	370 N⋅m (273 lb⋅ft) (manual) / 400 N⋅m (295 lb⋅ft) (automatic)	6-speed manual or automatic	RWD / 4WD

The four-wheel-drive system, branded 4XPLOR, includes a low-range gearbox, hill-descent and hill-hold control, and selectable terrain modes (Snow, Mud, Sand, and Normal).

== Safety ==
=== Global NCAP ===
In December 2022, the Scorpio-N received a five-star rating for adult occupant protection and a three-star rating for child occupant protection from the Global NCAP under its revised crash-test protocol.

Global NCAP 1.0 test results (India) Mahindra Scorpio-N (2022, similar to Latin NCAP 2013)
Test	Score	Stars
Adult occupant protection	29.25/17.00	5 /5 stars
Child occupant protection	28.93/49.00	3 /5 stars

=== ANCAP ===
ANCAP test results Mahindra Scorpio all variants (2023, aligned with Euro NCAP)
Test	Points	%
Overall:	0 /5 stars	
Adult occupant:	17.67	44%
Child occupant:	39.27	80%
Pedestrian:	14.94	23%
Safety assist:	0	0%

=== Standard safety equipment ===
All variants include anti-lock brakes, electronic stability control, dual front airbags, hill-start and hill-descent assist, ISOFIX child-seat mounts and a rear-view camera. Higher trims add side and curtain airbags, a tyre-pressure monitoring system, and a 360-degree camera.

=== Advanced driver assistance ===
In 2025, the top Z8L variant introduced Level 2 driver-assistance features, including forward-collision warning, automatic emergency braking, adaptive cruise control, lane-departure warning, and lane-keeping assistance.

== Technology ==
The Scorpio-N uses Mahindra's AdrenoX connected-vehicle platform offering remote lock/unlock, engine start, and over-the-air software updates. Features include a touchscreen infotainment system with Android Auto and Apple CarPlay, voice assistance through Alexa, wireless phone charging, and a multi-speaker audio system.

== Variants ==
The Scorpio-N is sold in several trim levels designated Z2, Z4, Z6, Z8 S, Z8, and Z8 L. Equipment varies by variant, ranging from basic two-airbag models to versions with a sunroof, advanced driver aids, and four-wheel drive. Pricing varies by model year and market conditions.

== Market and production ==
The model is assembled in Maharashtra for domestic sale and export to markets such as South Africa, Australia and New Zealand. In India, the Scorpio-N has become one of Mahindra's volume SUVs, produced alongside the Scorpio Classic.

== Reception ==
Automotive publications have noted that the Scorpio-N improves on its predecessor in ride comfort, build quality, and safety. Reviews also observed that the third-row seating remains limited for adults and that four-wheel drive is not available with the petrol engine.

== Competitors ==
The Scorpio-N competes in India with models such as the Tata Safari (2021), MG Hector Plus, Hyundai Alcazar, and Toyota Fortuner.

== Awards and recognition ==
- 5-Star Global NCAP Safety Rating (2022)
- Autocar India SUV of the Year (2023)
- TopGear India Best Family SUV (2024)

== See also ==
- Mahindra Scorpio
- Mahindra XUV700
- Mahindra Thar ROXX
- Mahindra & Mahindra
- Global NCAP
