= Banbirpur =

Village in Uttar Pradesh, India

- Village
- Location in Uttar Pradesh, India
- Coordinates: 28.4091°N 80.9785°E
- Country: India
- State: Uttar Pradesh
- District: Lakhimpur Kheri

Government
  - Type: Sarpanch (Pradhan)
  - Body: Gram panchayat and Nyaya panchayat
- Vehicle registration: UP- 31
- Website: kheri.nic.in

Banbirpur also spelled as Banveer Pur is a village near Tikunia in Lakhimpur Kheri district, Uttar Pradesh, India.

== History ==
On 3 October 2021 a series of violent incidents occurred on the Tikonia-Banbirpur road near Banbirpur village in the Tikunia area. There was a vehicle-ramming attack and mob lynching incident during a farmers’ protest against the three farm laws passed by the Bharatiya Janata Party led Union Government. It caused the deaths of eight people and injuries to 10 others. Four protesters and a journalist were run over by a vehicle, three others were killed in the subsequent violence. Two first information reports on the incident were filed at the Tikunia police station.

== Demographics ==
=== Population ===
The town had a population of 5,578 in 2011. Male population of 2,952 and 2,626 females. There were 1101 households in the village.

== Administration and politics ==
The village is part of the Nighasan Assembly constituency. Shashank Verma of the Bharatiya Janata Party is the member for the constituency since the 2019 bye polls.

=== Services ===
Tikunia police station serves the area.

== Transport ==
Tikonia-Banbirpur road connects the village with Tikunia nagar panchayat.
