= Mahindra Major =

Indian compact 2-door offroad SUV

The Mahindra Major is a sport utility vehicle by Indian manufacturer Mahindra & Mahindra. It was developed Mahindra & Mahindra, being based on the Jeep CJ-3B. It was first marketed in January 2003.

It has an altered "New Generation Chassis," which was a 115 x 60 mm steel box section rather than the 100 x 50 mm C-section used earlier. The chassis was first used on the Armada, beginning in January 1998 and gradually filtered into the rest of Mahindra's range. Over the years, the Mahindra Major has become a popular vehicle in rural areas of India, where it is used for transportation, agriculture, and other tasks. Due to its resemblance to the original Jeep, it has become commonly known as a "jeep" in these areas, even though it is a different vehicle made by a different company.

== History ==
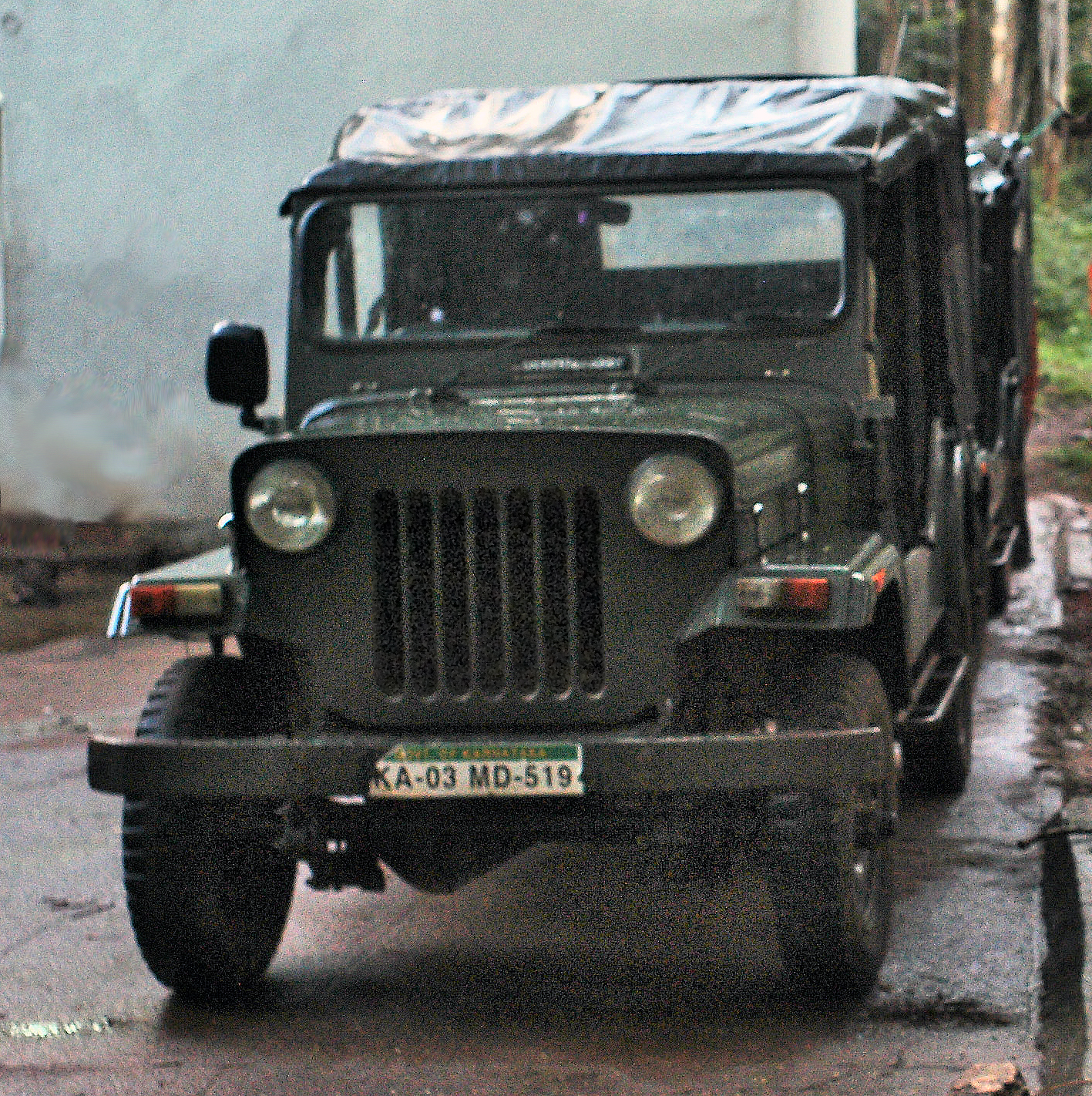
Mahindra CJ series utility vehicle.

In India, Mahindra acquired the license to build Willys Jeeps back in 1947 and began assembling the Willys CJ3B. In a sense, since then Mahindra has not stopped making the Jeep. The latest iteration of the Jeep is the Mahindra Thar, whose body style is based on Jeep CJ5. Initially the CJ3A and Willys MB were also assembled in India by Mahindra, but continued to be branded as Willys.

== Mahindra CJ 500/CL 500 (1975–1996) ==
Mahindra CJ 500

Overview
- Also called: Mahindra CL 500 (1994–1996)

Powertrain
- Engine: 2300 cc MD2350 diesel I4; 2522 cc MDI2450 diesel I4; 2522 cc MDI2500 DI diesel I4
- Transmission: 3-speed (Warner T90 Gearbox)

Chronology
- Predecessor: Mahindra Willys CJ4A
- Successor: Mahindra CL 550MDI

The CJ 500D of 1975 was the first Mahindra Jeeps to be factory fitted with a Diesel engine. The MD2350 Diesel Engine with 3-speed gearbox had 38 hp (28 kW; 39 PS), rather than the 72 hp (54 kW; 73 PS) of the Hurricane Petrol Engine. This pushed Mahindra to look for better & more powerful engine options. In spite of the lack of power, the CJ500D became one of the most wanted utility vehicle and the rural workhorse of India for the next 35 years, and finally ended up as the Mahindra Major.

The MD2450, 2.5 liter diesel engine with 3-speed T90 Warner gearbox appeared in the CJ 500DE in 1989, replacing the earlier model. This version still makes 38 hp (28 kW; 39 PS) at 2,300 rpm. It has a Spicer T18 2-speed Transfer Case.

In 1991 the engine was updated to the direct injected 40 hp (30 kW; 41 PS) MD2500 in the model named CJ 500DI. This was renamed CL 500 DI in 1994 after the end of the agreement with the Chrysler Corporation in 1994; CL stands for Civilian Legend.

=== Mahindra CJ-500 D (1975–1989) ===
CJ 500D was the first vehicle with a Diesel engine in the Mahindra Jeeps range. Mahindra's tractor division was manufacturing International Harvester B275 tractors, which were fitted with BD-144 diesel engines which were then adopted for utility vehicles. Initially the BD-144 diesel engine were fitted in Mahindra CJ-4A jeeps and introduced as Mahindra CJ 500D. This engine is popularly known as the International engine, which is used in Mahindra tractors.

- Mahindra MD2350 diesel engine, 2350cc
- Power: 38 hp (28 kW; 39 PS) @2300rpm
- Torque: 13 kg⋅m (130 N⋅m; 94 lb⋅ft) @1200rpm

=== Mahindra CJ-500 DE (1989–1991) ===
The upgraded MD2450 diesel engine was fitted on this vehicle to meet the emission regulations which came in to effect from 1989.

- Mahindra MD2450, 2.5 L diesel engine.
- 2522cc, 4 cylinder, Direct Injection
- Power: 38 hp (28 kW; 39 PS) @2300rpm
- Torque: 13 kg⋅m (130 N⋅m; 94 lb⋅ft) @1200rpm
- Warner T90 3-speed manual gearbox
- Spicer T-18 2-speed Transfer case (4WD)

=== Mahindra CJ-500 DI / CL-500 DI ===
- Mahindra MDI2500, 2.5 L diesel engine.
- Popularly known as the DI (Direct Injection) Engine, the most fuel efficient engine used in this generation.
- 2522cc, 4 cylinder, Direct Injection
- Power: 40 hp (30 kW; 41 PS) @ 2300rpm
- Torque: 14 kg⋅m (140 N⋅m; 100 lb⋅ft) @1400rpm
- Warner T90 3-speed manual gearbox
- Spicer T-18 2-speed Transfer case (4WD)

== Mahindra CL-550 MDI (1996–2005) ==
Mahindra CL 550 MDI

Overview
- Model years: 1996–2005

Powertrain
- Engine: 2522 cc MDI3000/3200 diesel I4
- Transmission: 4-speed, (KMT-90 gearbox)

Chronology
- Successor: Mahindra Major

From 1996 until 2005, the CL-550 MDI came with the 55 hp (41 kW; 56 PS) at 3000 rpm MDI3000 engine. In 2000, the engine was updated and renamed MDI3200; power increased to 63 hp (47 kW; 64 PS) at 3200 rpm.

== Mahindra Major (2004–2010) ==
Mahindra Major
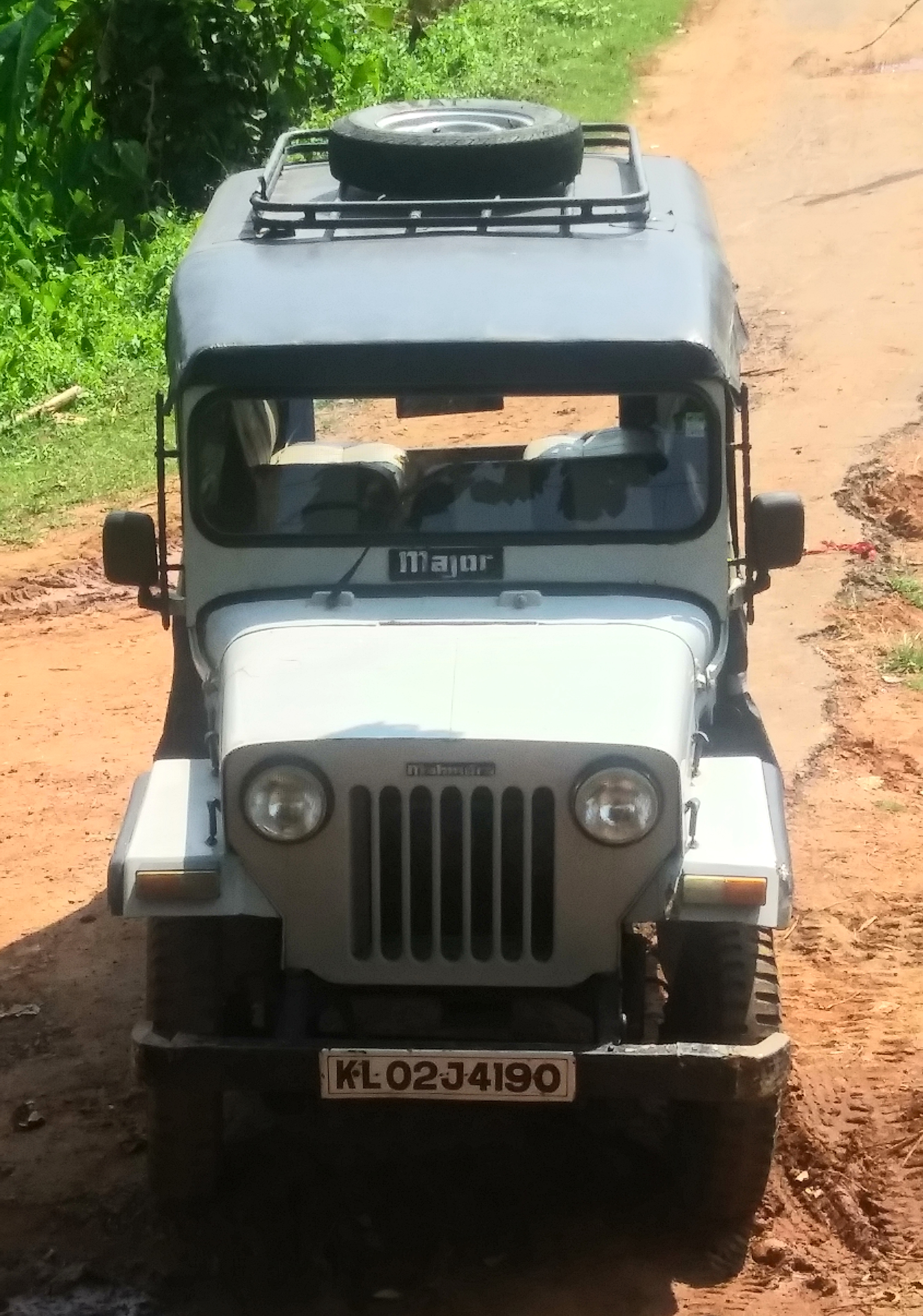
- Mahindra Major

Overview
- Manufacturer: Mahindra & Mahindra
- Also called: CL-550 MDI (before 2005)
- Production: 2004–2010
- Assembly: India: Kandivali, Mumbai

Body and chassis
- Class: Compact sport utility vehicle
- Body style: 3 doors, soft-top
- Layout: Front-engine, rear-wheel-drive layout Front-engine, four-wheel-drive layout

Powertrain
- Engine: 2523 cc MDI3200 TC diesel I4
- Power output: 63 hp (47 kW; 64 PS)
- Transmission: 5-speed NGT520 manual

Dimensions
- Wheelbase: 91 in (2,311 mm)

Chronology
- Predecessor: Mahindra CL-550 MDI
- Successor: Mahindra Thar

Major was an upgrade to the CL550 MDI vehicle with the upgraded MDI3200 Diesel engine.

=== Design and features ===
The Mahindra Major is a four-wheel-drive utility vehicle with a simple, boxy design that emphasizes functionality over style. It has a body-on-frame construction and a leaf-spring suspension, which contribute to its ruggedness and off-road capabilities. The vehicle is available in a range of body styles, including a soft-top convertible and a hardtop with optional air conditioning.

The interior of the Mahindra Major is basic but functional, with seating for up to six passengers. The dashboard features a simple instrument cluster with basic gauges, while the center console houses controls for the ventilation and heating systems.

=== Engine and Performance ===
The Mahindra Major is powered by a 2.5-liter turbodiesel engine that produces 62 horsepower and 182 Nm of torque. It is mated to a five-speed manual transmission, and power is sent to all four wheels via a transfer case. The Major has a top speed of around 120 km/h and can accelerate from 0 to 60 km/h in around 10 seconds.

The Mahindra Major is known for its off-road capabilities, thanks to its high ground clearance and four-wheel-drive system. It is often used by farmers, construction workers, and other professionals who need a vehicle that can handle rough terrain and heavy loads. It was equipped with a more powerful and fuel efficient MDI3200 engine, with quick starting response and lower oil consumption, as opposed to the F134 engine of the CJ-3B, though the F134 was quieter. Compared to previous versions, the MDI3200 engine has a new inline fuel injection system for lower fuel consumption and lower maintenance; later a rotary type pump was used. Power is fed to the wheels through a NGT 520 5-speed gearbox, and T18 Spicer 2-speed transfer case is found in 4WD models. The wheel track width is 123 cm (48 in), and the vehicle is equipped with recirculating ball steering.

Additional upgrades include modified rear axle ratio, new vinyl seats, new steering wheel, new front apron cover, new superstructure, new canopy, and radial tyres for longer life, better ride and handling.

The Major was made using tooling from discontinued Mitsubishi Jeeps, and is distinctive from previous CJ-3B based Mahindra vehicles in the following ways:

- The firewall is moved further forward of the passenger compartment
- The driver seat is lower
- The foot rests are made from pipe rather than a single stamping.
- The canvas roof's side windows have a different design.
- The use of the diesel MDI3200 TC engine rather than the petrol Hurricane F4-134.

The Major replaced the CJ500D/CL550 models and was placed below the posher Mahindra Thar. The wheelbase is 91 in (2,300 mm) and the track is increased by three inches to 51 in (1,300 mm).

Production ceased on 1 October 2010, and was reported as the last flat fender jeep to go out of production in the world. It is replaced by the Mahindra Thar.
