= Mahindra Thar ROXX =

Five-door variant of the Mahindra Thar SUV introduced in 2024

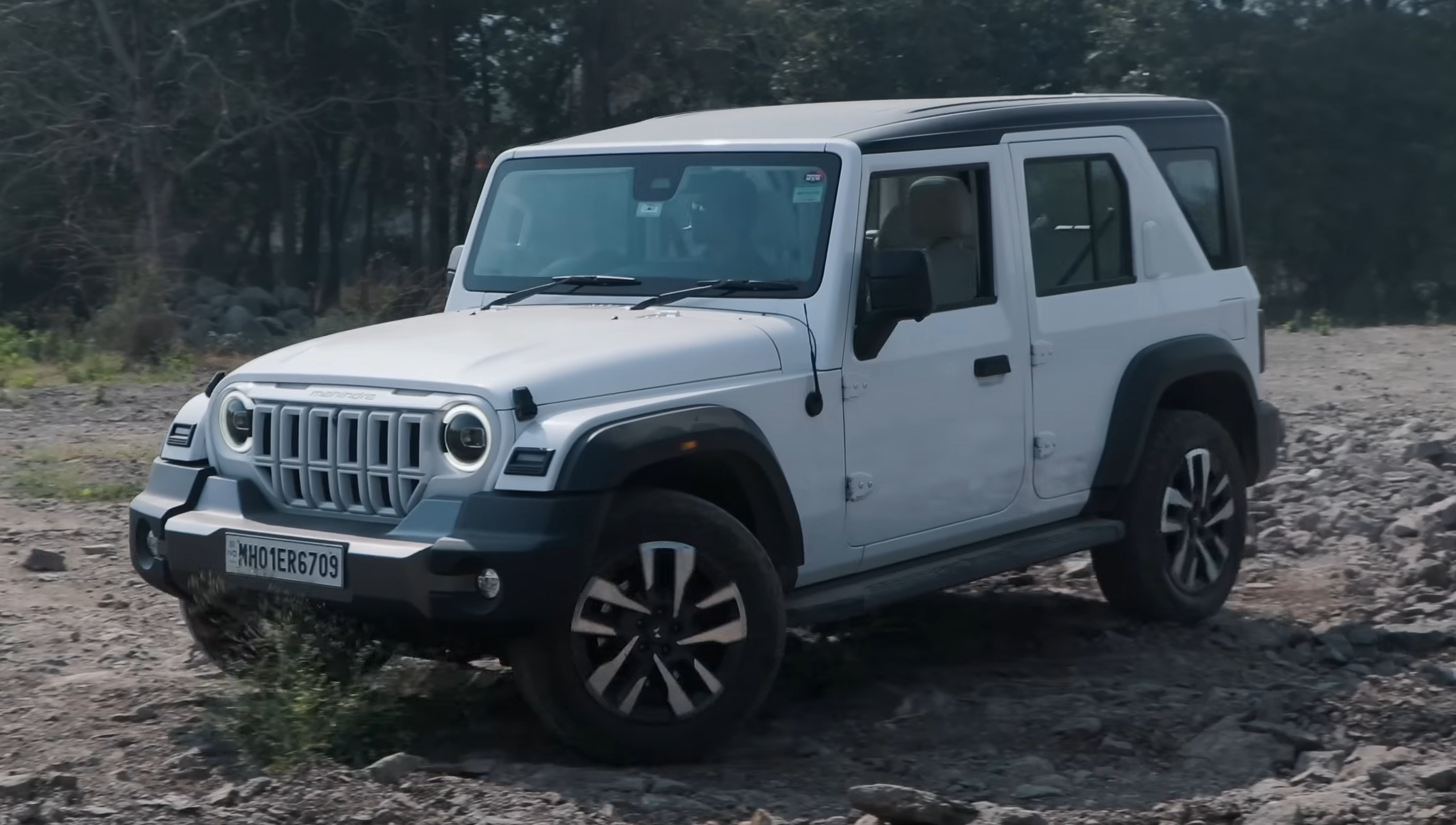

Overview
- Manufacturer: Mahindra & Mahindra
- Model code: W502
- Also called: Thar 5-door
- Production: 2024–present
- Model years: 2024–present
- Assembly: India: Chakan, Maharashtra

Body and chassis
- Class: Compact SUV
- Body style: 5-door SUV
- Layout: Front-engine, rear-wheel-drive Front-engine, four-wheel-drive
- Platform: Mahindra Scorpio-N ladder-frame chassis
- Related: Mahindra Thar; Mahindra Scorpio-N

Powertrain
- Engine: Petrol: 2.0 L mStallion I4 turbo; Diesel: 2.2 L mHawk I4 turbo
- Transmission: 6-speed manual; 6-speed automatic

Dimensions
- Wheelbase: 2,850 mm (112.2 in)
- Length: 4,265 mm (167.9 in)
- Width: 1,820 mm (71.7 in)
- Height: 1,900 mm (74.8 in)
- Curb weight: 1,800–1,950 kg (3,968–4,299 lb)

The Mahindra Thar ROXX is a compact SUV manufactured by Mahindra & Mahindra. Launched in September 2024, it is the five-door, long-wheelbase variant of the Mahindra Thar, intended to offer the off-road capability of the original Thar with additional cabin space and comfort for everyday use. The model is positioned between the Mahindra Scorpio-N and the Thar three-door, targeting the lifestyle SUV segment in India.

== Development and launch ==
The Thar ROXX was unveiled on 15 August 2024 and officially launched in September 2024 across India. It is based on the same body-on-frame platform as the Mahindra Scorpio-N, replacing the compact ladder chassis of the three-door Thar. This change allowed Mahindra to extend the wheelbase by approximately 300 mm, creating a five-door configuration with improved on-road comfort and interior space.

The ROXX was introduced in multiple variants, MX1, MX3, MX5, AX3L, AX5L and AX7L, and offered with both petrol and diesel engine options paired with six-speed manual or automatic transmissions. At launch, ex-showroom prices ranged between ₹14.99 lakh and ₹19.99 lakh, depending on drivetrain and trim level.

=== John Abraham Edition ===
In February 2025, Mahindra introduced the Thar ROXX John Abraham Edition, a limited-edition version of the five-door SUV named after Indian actor John Abraham. The edition was part of Mahindra’s marketing campaign emphasizing the Thar’s association with adventure and fitness. It featured a matte-black exterior finish, dark chrome highlights, a red-stitched interior, and an exclusive “JOHN” badging on the tailgate. Mechanically, it was identical to the standard ROXX LX 4X4 variant, powered by the 2.0-litre turbo-petrol or 2.2-litre diesel engine. Mahindra produced a limited number of units, and bookings were opened exclusively through the brand’s online platform.

== Design and features ==
=== Exterior ===
The Thar ROXX retains the design cues of the Thar series, such as flat body panels, circular headlamps, and wide wheel arches, while introducing several distinct elements:

- Larger body-coloured front grille with horizontal slats
- Extended wheelbase (2,850 mm) for a five-door layout
- Full-size rear doors, fixed metal roof, and redesigned quarter windows
- Alloy wheels up to 19 inches on higher variants
- A new color palette including Stealth Black, Deep Forest, and Desert Beige

=== Interior ===
The cabin features a revised layout with more equipment than the three-door Thar, including:

- 10.25-inch touchscreen infotainment system supporting Android Auto and Apple CarPlay
- Digital instrument cluster with off-road telemetry
- Dual-zone climate control, rear AC vents, and multiple USB-C ports
- Reclining rear seats with fold-flat capability for increased cargo space
- Safety features such as six airbags, rear-view camera, and hill-descent control

== Safety ==
Bharat NCAP test results Mahindra Thar ROXX (2024, based on Latin NCAP 2016)
Test	Score	Stars
Adult occupant protection	31.09/32.00	5 /5 stars
Child occupant protection	45.00/49.00	5 /5 stars

== Powertrain and performance ==
The Thar ROXX is available with the same engine lineup as the three-door model:

- 2.0-litre mStallion turbo-petrol engine producing 150 hp (112 kW) and 320 N⋅m (236 lb⋅ft)
- 2.2-litre mHawk diesel engine producing 130 hp (97 kW) and 300 N⋅m (221 lb⋅ft)

Both engines are offered with a six-speed manual or six-speed automatic transmission. Drivetrain options include rear-wheel drive (RWD) and four-wheel drive (4WD) with a low-range transfer case. The suspension is tuned slightly softer than that of the three-door model to enhance on-road ride quality.

== Market positioning and sales ==
The Thar ROXX expanded Mahindra’s presence in India’s growing lifestyle SUV category, competing with the Jimny 5-door and the Gurkha 5-door. According to sales data reported in May 2025, the Thar ROXX contributed to a significant increase in the Thar lineup’s sales compared with the previous year. The model also helped the Thar brand cross 300,000 cumulative sales within five years of the launch of its second generation.

In October 2025, Mahindra revised ROXX pricing following changes to India’s goods and services tax (GST) structure on SUVs, reducing prices by up to ₹1.33 lakh per variant.

== Reception ==
According to reviews by Autocar India and Hindustan Times Auto, the Thar ROXX was praised for its additional space, comfort, and practicality while retaining much of the Thar’s off-road capability. Critics noted that although it is more suitable for family use, the larger size and weight make it less agile than the three-door version. Reviewers described it as a “dual-purpose” SUV suited for both urban commuting and moderate adventure driving.

== See also ==
- Mahindra Thar
- Mahindra Scorpio
- Mahindra & Mahindra
- Automotive industry in India
