= Mahindra Roxor =

Off-road side-by-side UTV

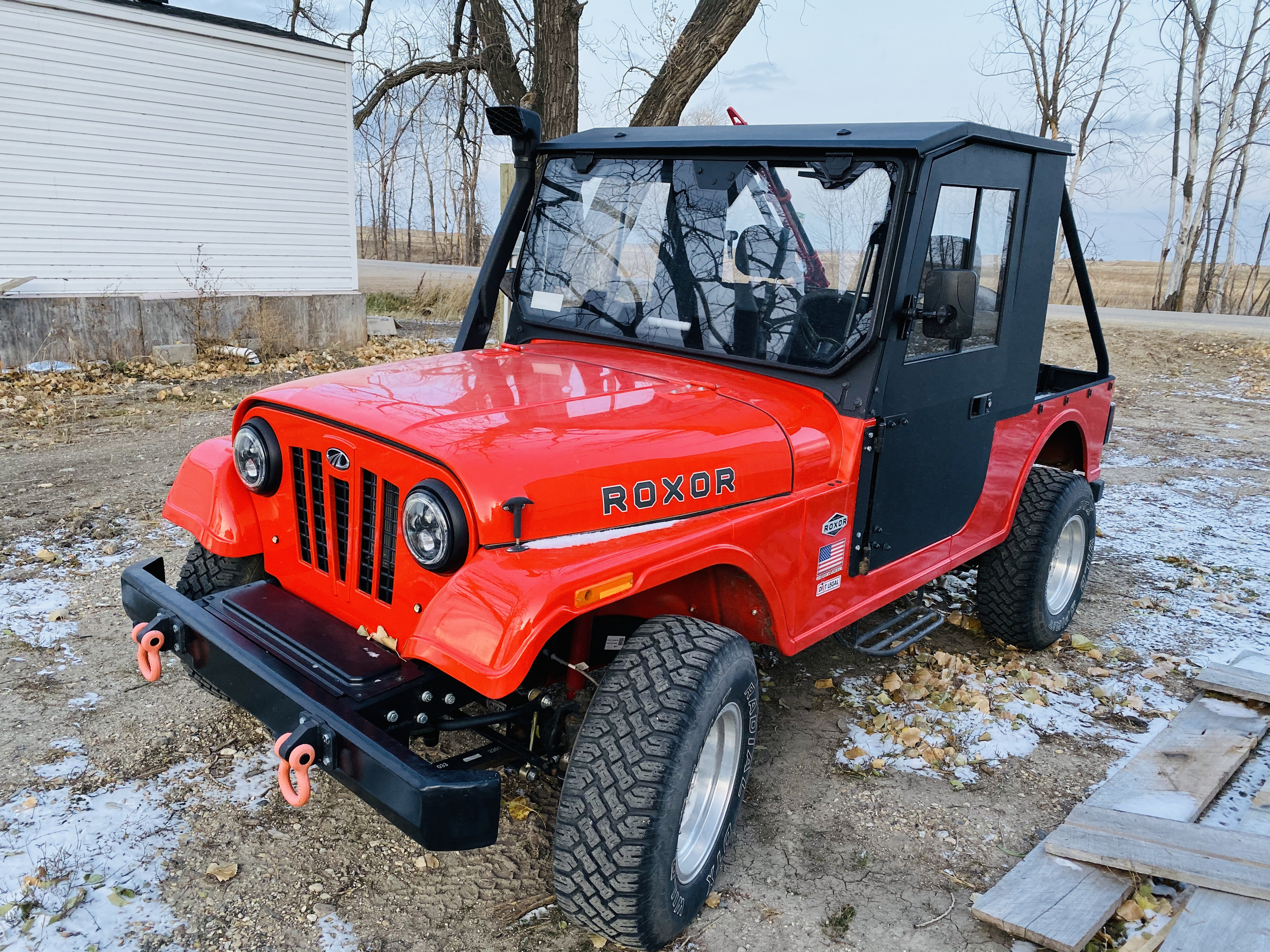

Overview
- Type: UTV 2-seater/4-seater
- Manufacturer: Mahindra Automotive North America (MANA)
- Production: 2018–present
- Model years: 2018–present
- Assembly: Auburn Hills, Michigan, US

Body and chassis
- Class: Side-by-side
- Layout: Front engine, part-time four-wheel-drive
- Related: Mahindra Thar

Powertrain
- Engine: 2.5 L Mahindra M2DICR turbodiesel 2.7 L turbodiesel
- Power output: 62 hp (46 kW) at 3,200 rpm (2.5); 55 hp (41 kW) at 2,300 rpm (2.7)
- Transmission: 5-speed NGT 520 manual 6-speed GM 6L50 automatic

Dimensions
- Wheelbase: 2,438 mm (96.0 in)
- Length: 3,759 mm (148.0 in)
- Width: 1,574 mm (62.0 in)
- Height: 1,905 mm (75.0 in)
- Curb weight: 1,376 kg (3,034 lb)

The Mahindra Roxor is a 4x4 off-road utility vehicle assembled by Mahindra Automotive North America (MANA) since 2018. It is based on a variant of the Mahindra Thar, produced and sold in the Indian market since 2010. Mahindra has made Jeep-like off-road vehicles since a 1947 contract with Willys to build them for the Indian market.

The Roxor was announced in November 2017 and began sales on March 2, 2018. In the United States, it is classified as an off-highway side-by-side (SxS). The Roxor is assembled at Mahindra's factory in Auburn Hills, Michigan, and is sold across the U.S. and Canada.

== Design ==
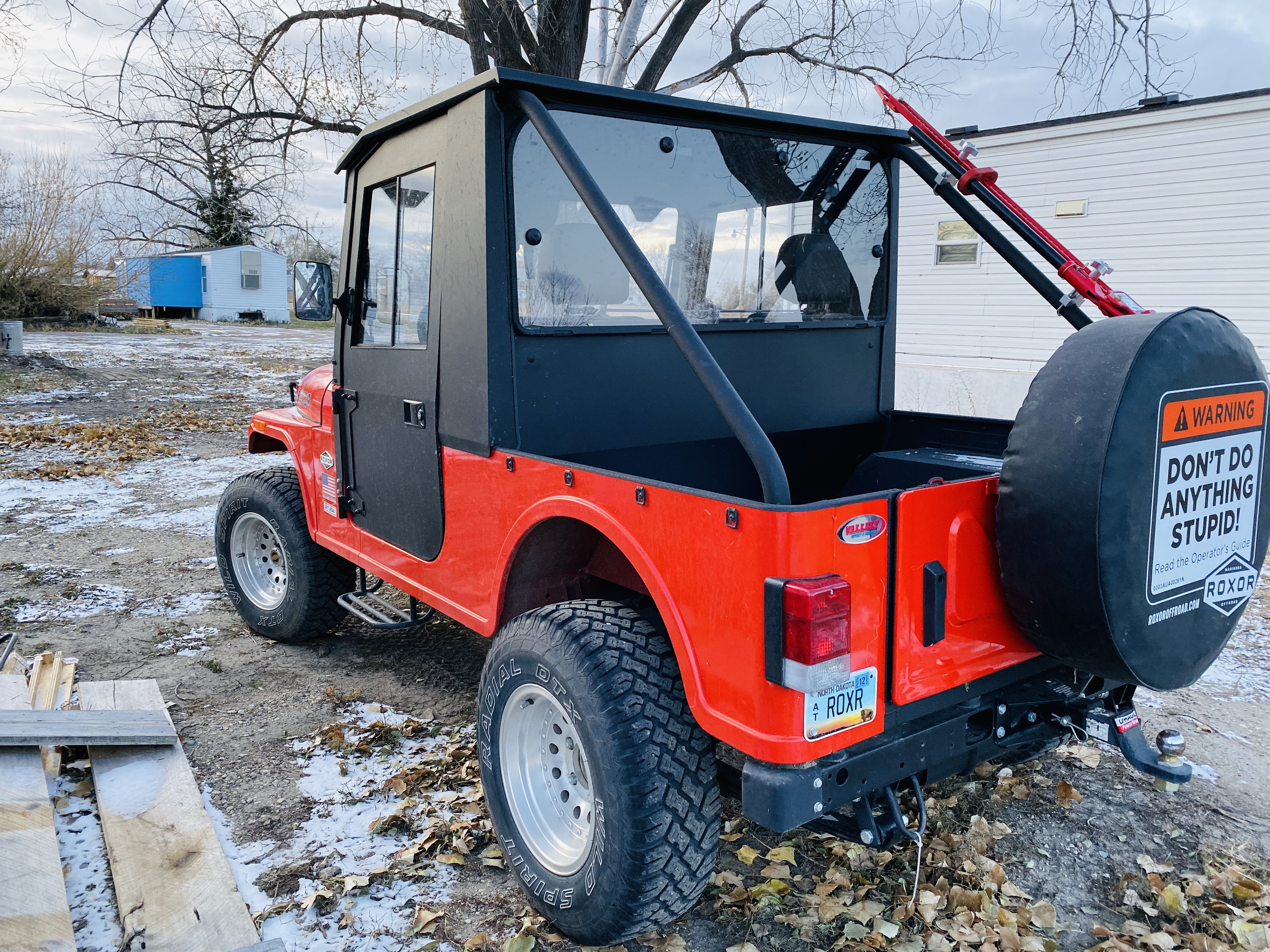
Rear view

The Roxor is based on the design of the Willys and Jeep CJ models made from the 1940s through the 1980s. Mahindra was granted a license in 1947 to use the Jeep and CJ trademarks, and Willys originally shipped complete vehicle kits directly to Mahindra. Over time, the vehicle's manufacturing was localized in India.

In the US market, the Roxor has a roll-over protection system, which creates the upper body structure and is attached directly to the frame. It has a speedometer, digital fuel gauge, odometer, and tachometer.

The Roxor is available in two- and four-passenger versions and with either a manual or automatic transmission. It can be had with 16 in (410 mm) steel or aluminum wheels, with several options for tires.

== Powertrain ==
The Roxor is powered by the Mahindra M2DICR 2.5 L (150 cu in) direct-injection turbodiesel engine that produces 63 bhp (47 kW) at 3,200 rpm and 144 lb⋅ft (195 N⋅m) of torque at 1,400 rpm and has a compression ratio of 18.6:1.

To ensure safe off-highway use, the top speed is electronically limited to 45 mph (72 km/h) in the 2018 model and 55 mph (89 km/h) for 2019 and newer models.

The HDUV version is powered by a 4-cylinder 2,730 cc (167 cu in) turbo diesel engine that produces 55 bhp (41 kW) at 2,300 rpm and 144 lb⋅ft (195 N⋅m) torque at 1,400 rpm, mated to a five-speed manual gearbox.

== Drivetrain ==
The Mahindra NGT 520 transmission is a 5-speed synchromesh design with a cast iron housing. The dual-offset cast-iron transfer case has a 2.46:1 low range ratio. The leaf-sprung straight axles are of a design similar to that of the Dana 44 and have a 3.73:1 final drive ratio. The front and rear differentials are open, allowing easier turning on hard surfaces, but less traction on loose or off-road surfaces.

Since mid-2018, a 6L50 automatic transmission sourced from Punch Powerglide in Strasbourg, France, has been offered as an option on the Roxor.

== Trademark dispute and facelift ==
Fiat Chrysler Automobiles, then-owner of the Jeep brand, filed a complaint in August 2018 with the United States International Trade Commission to halt sales in the US, saying the design infringed on FCA's copyrights. Mahindra and its North American division filed a public interest statement with the trade commission on August 22, 2018, asserting that FCA's complaints were without merit, and that they had begun proceedings in a Michigan court to enforce a design agreement that it claims to have executed with Fiat in 2009.

In late 2019, Judge Cameron Elliot ruled in favor of FCA, stating that the International Trade Commission should issue a limited exclusion order to prevent Mahindra from importing new Roxor vehicles or parts, and a cease-and-desist order (to block Mahindra from selling vehicles already in the US. On June 11, 2020, the U. S. International Trade Commission affirmed the decision. The ITC did not find that the Roxor's grille infringes upon Jeep's trademarked 7-slot grille. Rather, the vehicle overall infringes upon Jeep's trade dress used formerly in their CJ series vehicles, and currently on their Wrangler series vehicles. In particular, the Roxor has "a boxy body shape with flat vertical sides, rear body panels that are roughly the same height as the hood, the door cut-outs that go above the bottom of the side, exterior hood latches, a mostly flat and rounded-edge hood tapering toward the front... and the trapezoidal flared fenders that extend past the grille."

While Mahindra has often highlighted the differences between the Roxor and the Jeep, the ITC ruling forced them to redesign the vehicle. Acknowledging the Roxor's similarities to Jeep vehicles, Rick Haas, Mahindra Automotive North America CEO and President, stated that the Roxor is "actually a CJ," and that "everyone understands that our vehicle is a CJ."

In December 2020, the International Trade Commission issued its final ruling and determined that Mahindra's redesigned 2021 Roxor does not infringe on the "Jeep Trade Dress" claimed by Fiat Chrysler Automobiles.
