= Tikunia =

- town
- Tikunia, Kheri
- Coordinates: 28.38317°N 80.966478°E
- Country: India
- State: Uttar Pradesh
- District: Kheri

Languages
  - Official: Hindi
- Time zone: UTC+5:30 (IST)
- Postal code: 262906

Tikunia is a nagar panchayat in Lakhimpur Kheri district in the Indian state of Uttar Pradesh. Khairatiya village is near about 10 km from tikunia in the east side.

== Location ==
Tikunia is very close to the boundary of Nepal, and residents have easy access to Nepal.

== History ==
In 2021, Lakhimpur Kheri massacre occurred on the Tikonia-Banbirpur road near Banbirpur village in the Tikunia area. It was a vehicle-ramming attack and mob lynching incident during farmers’ protest against the three farm laws passed by the BJP led Union Government. It happened on 3 October 2021 at Tikunia in Lakhimpur Kheri district, Uttar Pradesh, India resulting in deaths of eight people and injuries to 10 others. Four protesters and a journalist were run over by the car, three others were killed in the subsequent violence. Two First information reports (FIR) on the incident were filed in the Tikunia police station.

== Administration and politics ==
=== Services ===
Tikunia police station serves the area.

== Transport ==
Tikunia is 188 km. from the state capital Lucknow and 84.4 km from Lakhimpur Kheri. Tikunia can be reached by road following State Highway 21 (SH21).

Tikonia-Banbirpur road connects Tikunia with Banbirpur village.

Tikunia has a railway station and can be easily reached by train or UPSRTC Bus services.
