= Mahindra Thar =

Compact SUV

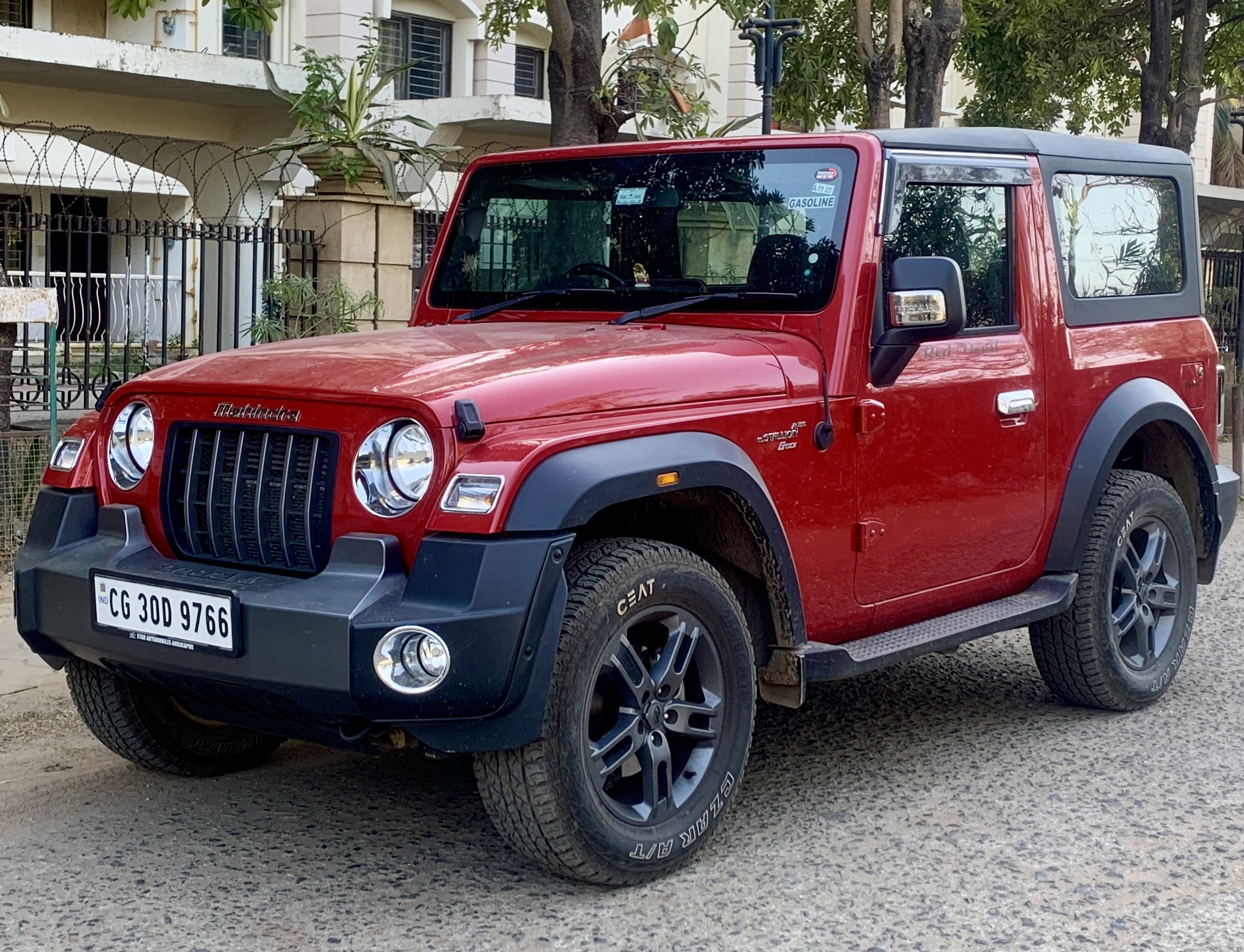

Overview
- Manufacturer: Mahindra & Mahindra
- Also called: Mahindra Thar ROXX (5-door)
- Production: 2010–present

Body and chassis
- Class: Compact SUV
- Body style: 2-door SUV; 5-door SUV (Thar ROXX)
- Layout: Front engine, four-wheel drive

Chronology
- Predecessor: Mahindra MM530

The Mahindra Thar is a compact SUV manufactured by Indian automaker Mahindra & Mahindra. It was introduced on October 4, 2010 and replaced the Mahindra Major.

== Background ==
Named after the Thar Desert, it was first introduced in 2010 as a modernized version of the Mahindra Major, which was based on the Mahindra MM540, which was in production in India since the 1980s. Its design is based on the Jeep CJ series, which Mahindra had been producing under license since the 1940s.

It is capable of handling well on both roads and challenging offroad terrain in the country.

== First generation (2010) ==
First generation
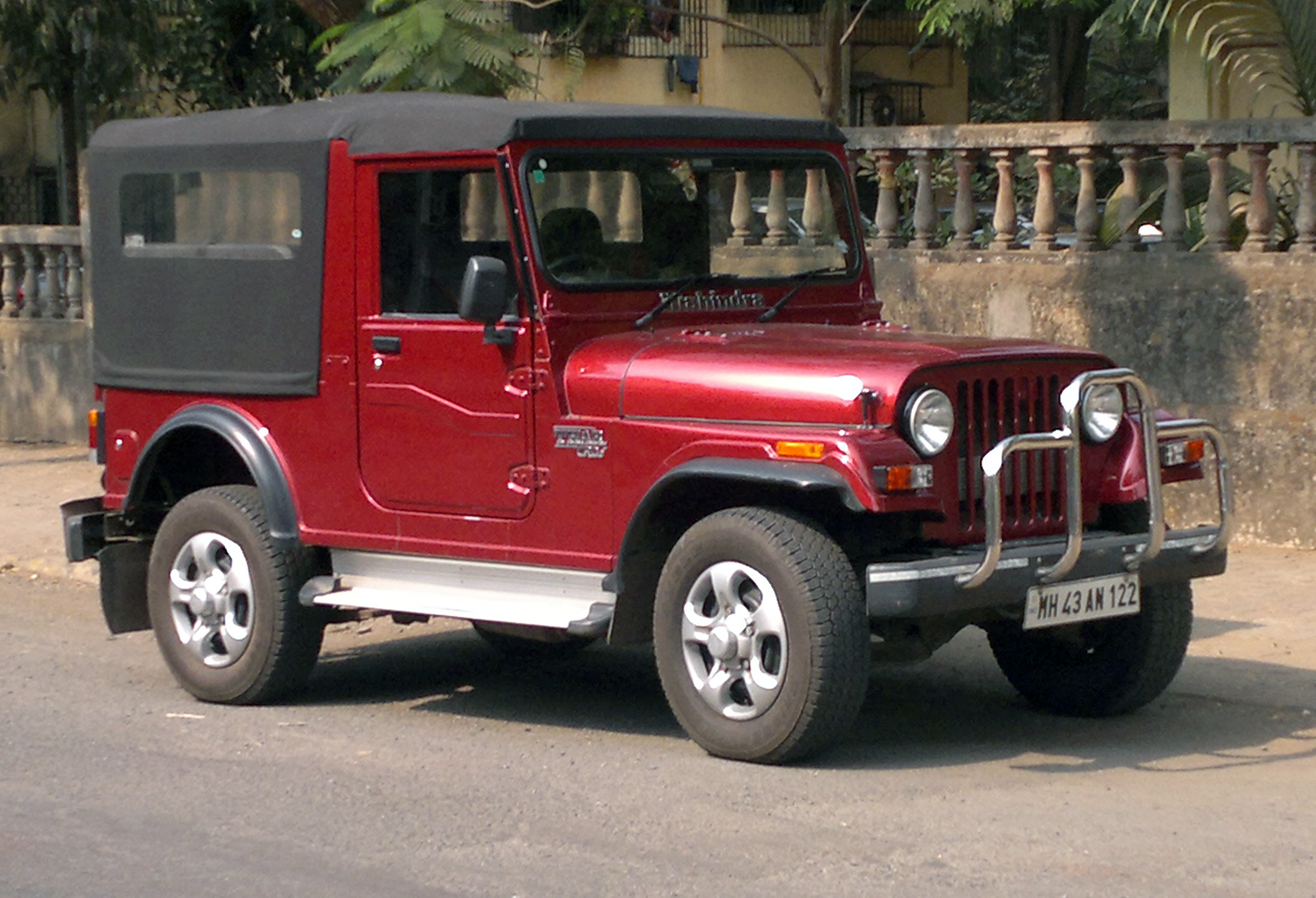

Overview
- Production: 2010–2020
- Assembly: India: Nasik, Maharashtra

Body and chassis
- Related: Mahindra Roxor

Powertrain
- Engine: 2.53 L MDi3200TC DI turbodiesel I4; 2.5 L NEF TCI-CRDe turbodiesel I4
- Transmission: 5-speed manual

Dimensions
- Wheelbase: 2,430 mm (95.7 in)
- Length: 3,920 mm (154.3 in)
- Width: 1,726 mm (68.0 in)
- Height: 1,930 mm (76.0 in)

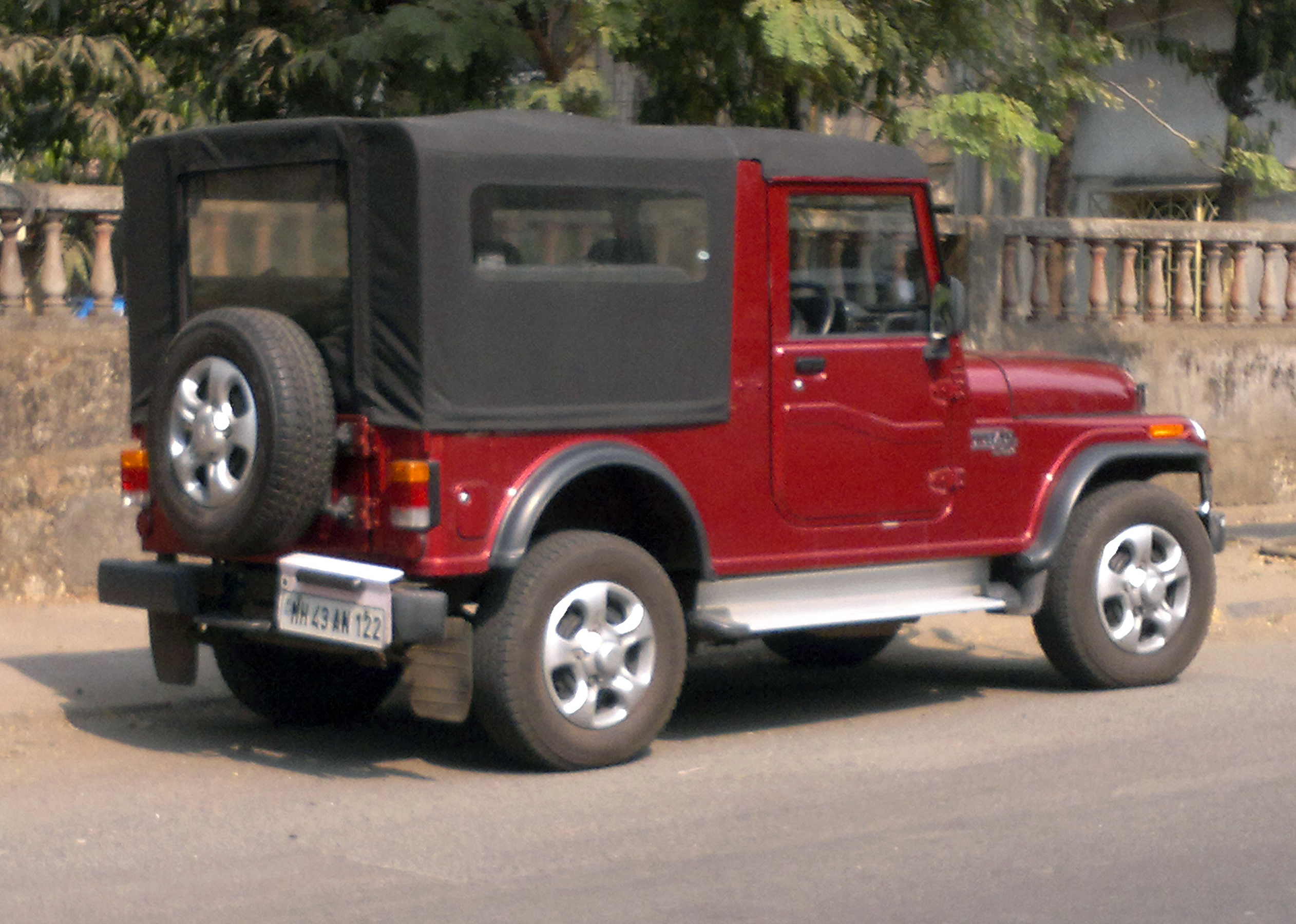
Rear view

The Mahindra Thar was launched in the Indian market on October 4, 2010 to fill the void left by its predecessor, the Mahindra MM540. Three variants - DI 2WD, DI 4WD, and CRDe, are available with soft-top versions. It also comes with a seven-seater option, though it can be converted into a two-seater.

It was powered by a 2.5-liter turbocharged diesel engine that produced 63 hp (47 kW; 64 PS) and 182 N⋅m (134 lb⋅ft) of torque. The vehicle was available in two trim levels: the DI 2WD and the DI 4WD. The DI 2WD was a basic version that came with a soft top and no air conditioning, while the DI 4WD came with air conditioning and a hardtop.

In 2015, Mahindra introduced an updated version of the Thar called the Thar CRDe. CRDe is an acronym for "common rail diesel engine," which was a more advanced engine that produced 105 hp (78 kW; 106 PS) and 247 N⋅m (182 lb⋅ft) of torque. The Thar CRDe also had updated safety features, such as airbags and ABS, and was available in two trim levels: the CRDe 4WD and the CRDe 4WD AC.

=== Mahindra Roxor ===
The Mahindra Roxor was unveiled by Mahindra Automotive North America on March 2, 2018. It is a variant of the Thar for United States market, assembled in Auburn Hills, Michigan from complete knock-down kits. Unlike the Thar, the Roxor is not street legal, and is positioned as a side-by-side off-road vehicle with a top speed of 45 mph. The Roxor is powered by a 2.5 L turbodiesel, four-cylinder engine producing 62 hp and 144 lb-ft of torque, mated to a five-speed manual transmission. An automatic transmission is available as an option. It is only available with two seats, a 148-inch body length, and a 96-inch wheelbase.

== Second generation (W501; 2020) ==
Second generation
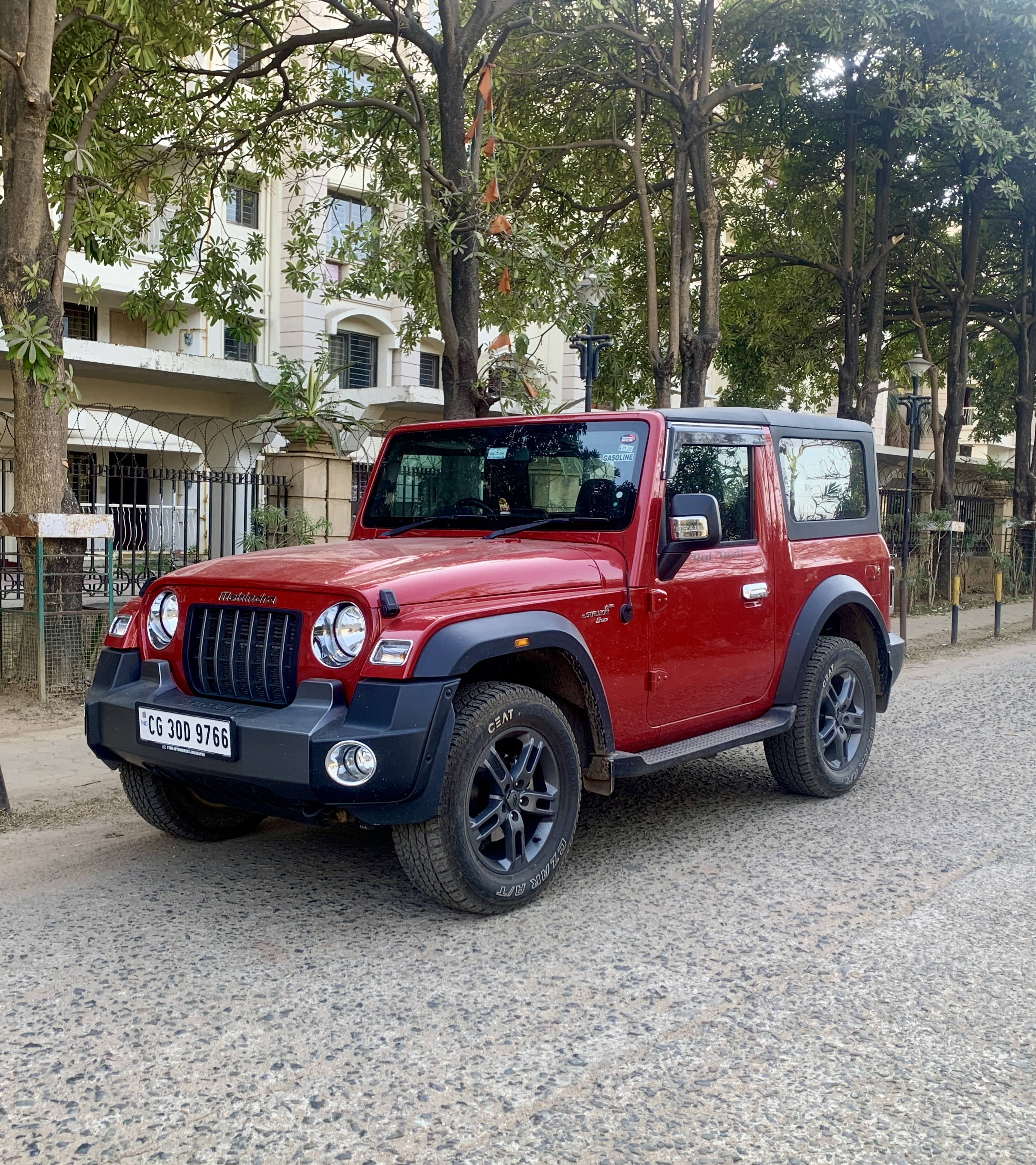
- 2020 Mahindra Thar LX (Pre–facelift)

Overview
- Model code: W501
- Also called: Mahindra Thar ROXX (5-door); Mahindra Thar OG (Facelift)
- Production: 2020–present
- Assembly: India: Nashik, Maharashtra

Powertrain
- Engine: petrol: 2.0 L mStallion turbo I4; diesel: 1.5 L 4D15 turbo I4; 2.2 L mHawk turbo I4
- Transmission: 6-speed manual 6-speed automatic

Dimensions
- Wheelbase: 2,450 mm (96.5 in)
- Length: 3,985 mm (156.9 in)
- Width: 1,820–1,855 mm (71.7–73.0 in)
- Height: 1,844–1,920 mm (72.6–75.6 in)

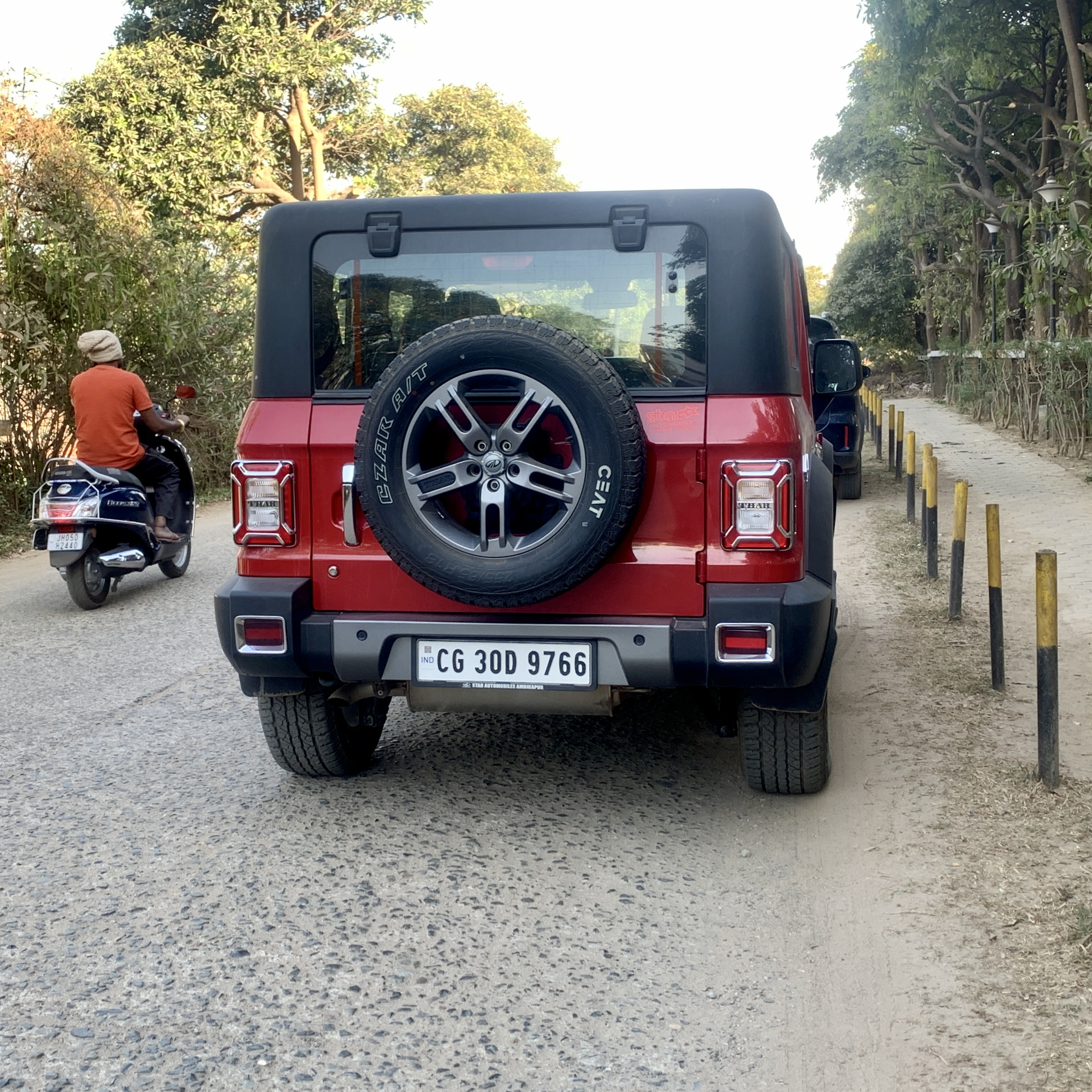
Rear view

The second-generation Mahindra Thar was introduced on August 15, 2020. It was a complete redesign of the vehicle, and it became available for sale in October 2020.

It modernized design that features a bold grille, LED headlights, and a hardtop roof. It comes with two engine options, a 2.0-litre petrol and a 2.2-litre diesel. Both are offered with a choice of 6-speed automatic transmission (with a torque converter gearbox) made by Aisin or 6-speed manual transmission. The Thar also has updated suspension and drivetrain components including multi-link rear suspension, as well as a range of new features, such as a touchscreen infotainment system, a rearview camera, and an adventure statistics display.

The Thar 2020 is available in two trim levels: the base AX and the more premium LX. Customers have the option to choose between a hard top, soft top or soft top with a convertible-like folding down mechanism. In 2023 the W503 Thar got 4D15 rwd verson.

=== 2025 Update ===
In October 2025, Mahindra & Mahindra launched a Updated version of the second-generation Mahindra Thar in India. The update focused on subtle exterior revisions, new convenience features, and interior upgrades while retaining the existing powertrain lineup.

On the outside, the facelift featured a new body-coloured grille, a dual-tone bumper with silver inserts, and two new paint options Tango Red and Battleship Grey while retaining the vehicle’s characteristic round headlamps and boxy design.

Inside, the Thar featured an all-black cabin with a redesigned dashboard, a steering wheel shared with the XUV700, and repositioned power-window switches on the doors. Additional updates included rear AC vents, individual armrests, a sliding centre armrest, and a grab handle on the A-pillar.

A larger 10.25-inch touchscreen infotainment system with Android Auto, Apple CarPlay, and off-road statistics was introduced, along with a rear-view camera, rear wiper and washer, and connected-car telematics.

The facelift retained the same engine lineup as before - a 2.0-litre turbo-petrol, 1.5-litre diesel, and 2.2-litre diesel - paired with six-speed manual and automatic transmissions in both rear-wheel-drive and four-wheel-drive configurations. At launch, prices ranged from ₹9.99 lakh to ₹16.99 lakh (ex-showroom, India).

=== 2026 Facelift ===
On 22 September 2026, Mahindra launched the facelifted 3-door variant, called the Thar OG, priced from ₹10.32 lakh to ₹18.99 lakh (ex-showroom), with deliveries beginning 11 October 2026. Built on a new-generation platform, the update introduced LED headlamps shared with the Mahindra Thar ROXX, more powerful turbo-petrol and mHawk diesel engines, electric power steering, frequency-dependent dampers (DAVINCI), and standard six airbags with all-wheel disc brakes and electronic stability programme. The Thar OG continues to compete with other body-on-frame SUVs such as the Force Gurkha and Maruti Suzuki Jimny.

=== Mahindra Thar ROXX (W502; 2024) ===
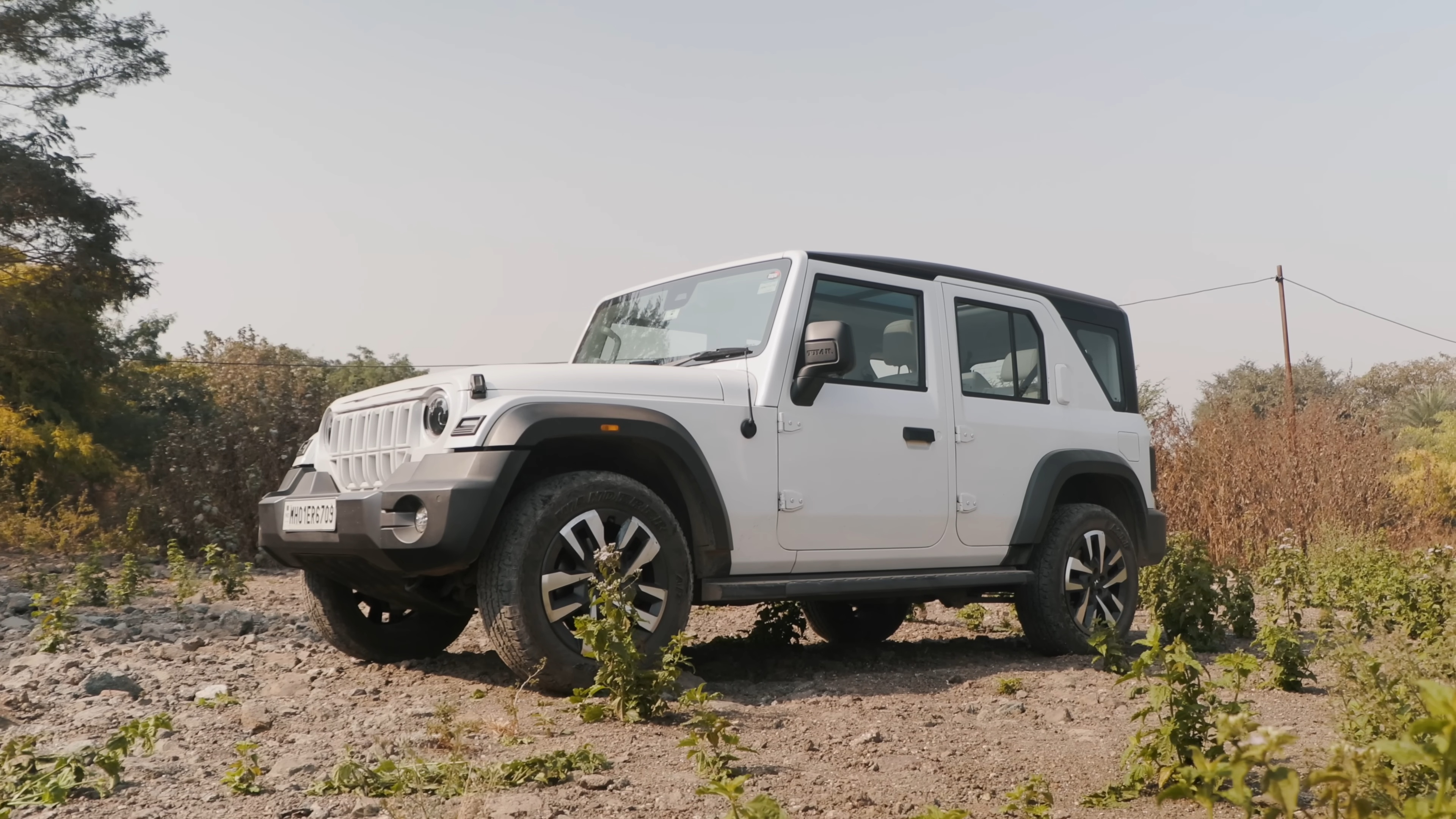
Mahindra Thar ROXX

The W502 Thar ROXX was teased by Mahindra on 20 July 2024, a 5-door version of the Thar. It was launched on August 15, 2024. With a redesigned grille, new LED headlights and tail lamps, 10.27-inch touchscreen infotainment, panoramic sunroof and ADAS as well a dual-tone alloy coating. The White colour seats are discontinued and it was replaced with the Mocca Grey seat colour. The engine that Roxx got was D22 MHawk with 4X4 and G20 MSTALLION only in 4X2 both engine 6-speed manual and 6-speed torque converter.

== Safety ==
The Global NCAP 1.0 crash-tested the second-generation Mahindra Thar in its basic safety specification of two airbags and Isofix anchorages in 2020 (similar to Latin NCAP 2013). It achieved four stars for adult protection, with its passenger compartment remaining stable in the offset frontal test. However, its footwell ruptured during the test. The car was penalised for instability of footwell response and for this reason Mahindra was denied the opportunity of demonstrating that sharp structures in the dashboard could prove benign to the knees of differently sized occupants. Hence Global NCAP penalised the knee areas and the vehicle could not achieve the maximum five star rating for adult protection.

Nevertheless, Mahindra requested an ECE side impact test for the Thar, in which the car passed this basic test despite not being fitted with side airbags. The driver's seat in the Mahindra Thar is high enough for the car to be exempted from this regulation, but Global NCAP required that the test be performed nevertheless. However, since the Thar lost crucial points in the frontal impact, the side impact had no influence on the result.

The Mahindra Thar was sold in a basic trim level with side-facing rear seats. These seats were not fitted with three-point seatbelts or ISOFIX anchorages and would render the vehicle unsuitable for safely transporting children, which would cause Global NCAP to award the car no stars for child occupant protection. Global NCAP warned Mahindra to withdraw this variant of the Thar from the market, failing which they would publish a result of this basic variant in addition to the tested variant. Global NCAP only agreed to publish the result of a variant with forward-facing seats after sales of the basic variant were stopped, making forward-facing seats the basic specification for the model.

Mahindra also requested Global NCAP to test the Thar's optional electronic stability control. The model met minimum performance requirements for yaw rate in the UN's test with a steering robot, but it showed unstable dynamic behaviour with tendency to roll, and Global NCAP recommended an improvement, to deliver a more robust performance in real-life scenarios.

The Thar is not fitted with side impact airbags for the body or head, even as an option.

Global NCAP 1.0 test results (India) Mahindra Thar – 2 Airbags (2020, similar to Latin NCAP 2013)
Test	Score	Stars
Adult occupant protection	12.52/17.00	4 /5 stars
Child occupant protection	41.11/49.00	4 /5 stars

== Sales ==
The second generation Thar sold over 185,000 units by August 2024.

== Awards ==
The Mahindra Thar ROXX has been awarded as Car Of The Year in 2024 by Autocar India.
