= Mahindra XUV300 =

Subcompact SUV produced by the Indian automaker

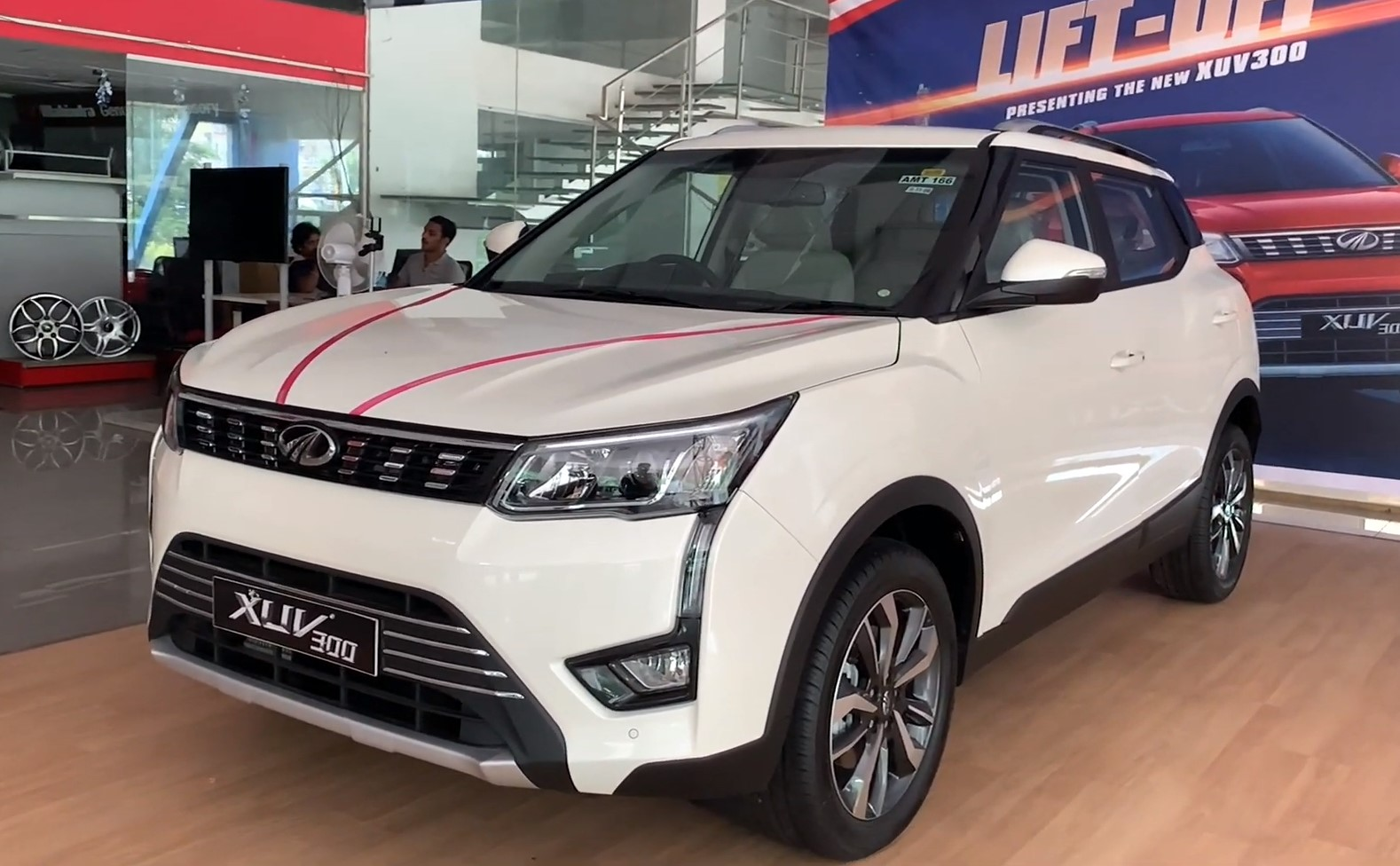

Overview
- Manufacturer: Mahindra & Mahindra
- Model code: S201; S210 (Electric)
- Also called: Mahindra XUV400 (Electric Version)
- Production: 2019–2024 (XUV300); 2022–2026 (XUV400)
- Assembly: India: Nashik, Maharashtra

Body and chassis
- Class: Subcompact crossover SUV
- Body style: 5-door SUV
- Layout: Front-engine, front-wheel-drive
- Platform: S201 Platform
- Related: SsangYong Tivoli

Powertrain
- Engine: 1.5 L 4D15 CRDe I4, (diesel); 1.2 L mStallion TCMPFi I3, 1.2-litre mStallion TGDi I3 T-GDI (petrol)
- Transmission: 6-speed Manual; 6-speed automated manual

Dimensions
- Wheelbase: 2,600 mm (100 in)
- Length: 3,995 mm (157.3 in)
- Width: 1,821 mm (71.7 in)
- Height: 1,617 mm (63.7 in)
- Kerb weight: Diesel-1456kg, Gasoline-1285kg

Chronology
- Successor: Mahindra XUV 3XO (facelift)

The Mahindra XUV300 is a Subcompact crossover SUV produced by the Indian automaker Mahindra & Mahindra. It is based on the X100 platform of SsangYong Tivoli. Its facelifted version is the Mahindra XUV 3XO.

== History ==
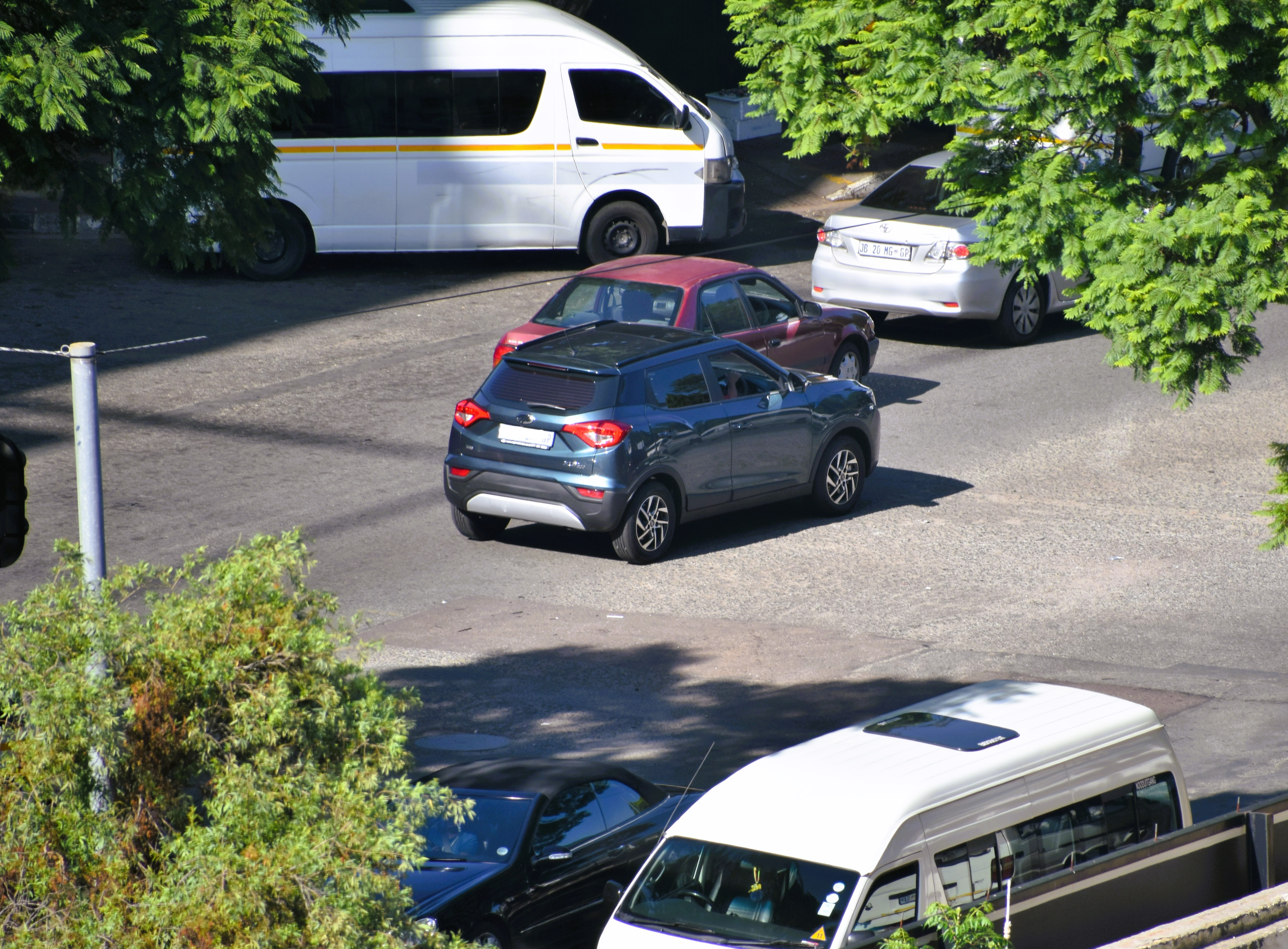
Rear view (blue)

The XUV300 was initially codenamed as S201. Based on European spec Ssangyong Tivoli, it underwent major modifications to suit Indian roads and market conditions. The SUV was wind tunnel tested at Pininfarina facility in Italy. Mahindra officially revealed the name of XUV300 in December 2018. The XUV is wider and taller than Tivoli in dimensions but is made shorter than the counterpart to fit into sub-four-meter segment. It also resembles its sibling XUV500 in looks with similar projector headlamps and DRLs, front grille and the wheel arches. It was launched on 14 February 2019 in India.

== Engine ==
The XUV300 is powered by a 1.2-litre 3-cylinder petrol engine and a 1.5-litre 4-cylinder diesel engine with 6-speed manual transmission. A 6-speed automated manual variant was also available. The new petrol engine co-developed by Ssangyong delivers 110 hp (82 kW; 112 PS) of power and 200 N⋅m (148 lb⋅ft; 20 kg⋅m) of torque. while the diesel engine borrowed from Mahindra Marazzo but with eVGT (Electric Variable Geometry Turbocharger) outputs 115 hp (86 kW; 117 PS) of power and 300 N⋅m (221 lb⋅ft; 31 kg⋅m) of torque.

== Safety ==
=== India ===
The Mahindra XUV300 was tested in its most basic safety specification of 2 airbags and standard ISOFIX anchorages. It scored 5 stars for adult occupant protection and 4 stars for child occupant protection, scoring the highest combined rating for any Indian car tested yet and the first four-star child safety rating. Its structure was deemed to be capable of higher loading. It is also the first five-star rated car to offer side and curtain airbags as an option. It offers side, curtain and knee airbags only as an option on all variants total of 7 airbag. ESC is optional. ISOFIX anchorages are standard. The car offers head restraints for all passengers in its higher variants, however the three-point seatbelt which was available for the middle rear occupant on higher variants at launch has been replaced by a less safe 2-point lap belt across the range as of 2021.

Mahindra sponsored a UN ESC test and pedestrian protection test with Global NCAP 1.0 in 2020 (similar to Latin NCAP 2013), which it passed, hence earning the car Global NCAP's Safer Choice Award.

Global NCAP 1.0 test results (India) Mahindra XUV300 – 2 Airbags (2020, similar to Latin NCAP 2013)
Test	Score	Stars
Adult occupant protection	16.42/17.00	5 /5 stars
Child occupant protection	37.44/49.00	4 /5 stars

Bharat NCAP test results Mahindra XUV 400 EV (2024, based on Latin NCAP 2016)
Test	Score	Stars
Adult occupant protection	30.38/32.00	5 /5 stars
Child occupant protection	43.00/49.00	5 /5 stars

== Mahindra XUV400 ==
On 11 September 2022, Mahindra announced the electric version of the XUV 300, named XUV 400 (internal code name S210). It retained the same design and equipment as its ICE-driven counterpart. It was equipped with a 39.4 kWh Li-ion battery pack with an estimated 456 km range as tested by ARAI. It had a front mounted electric motor producing 150 hp and 310 Nm of torque, which enabled a 0 to 60 mph time of 8.1 seconds. Critics praised the vehicle for its performance and ease of use, but many noted its lack of premium features and the overall interior being dated. The XUV400 went through updates in January 2024, (internal code name S237) with a new interior now shared with the facelifted Mahindra XUV 3X0. New equipment included dual 10.25 inch screens and a new steering wheel along with rear AC vents and a full 3-point seat belt for the rear centre seat. Its main competitor was the Tata Nexon EV. Eventually, it was replaced by the Mahindra XUV 3XO EV in 2026.

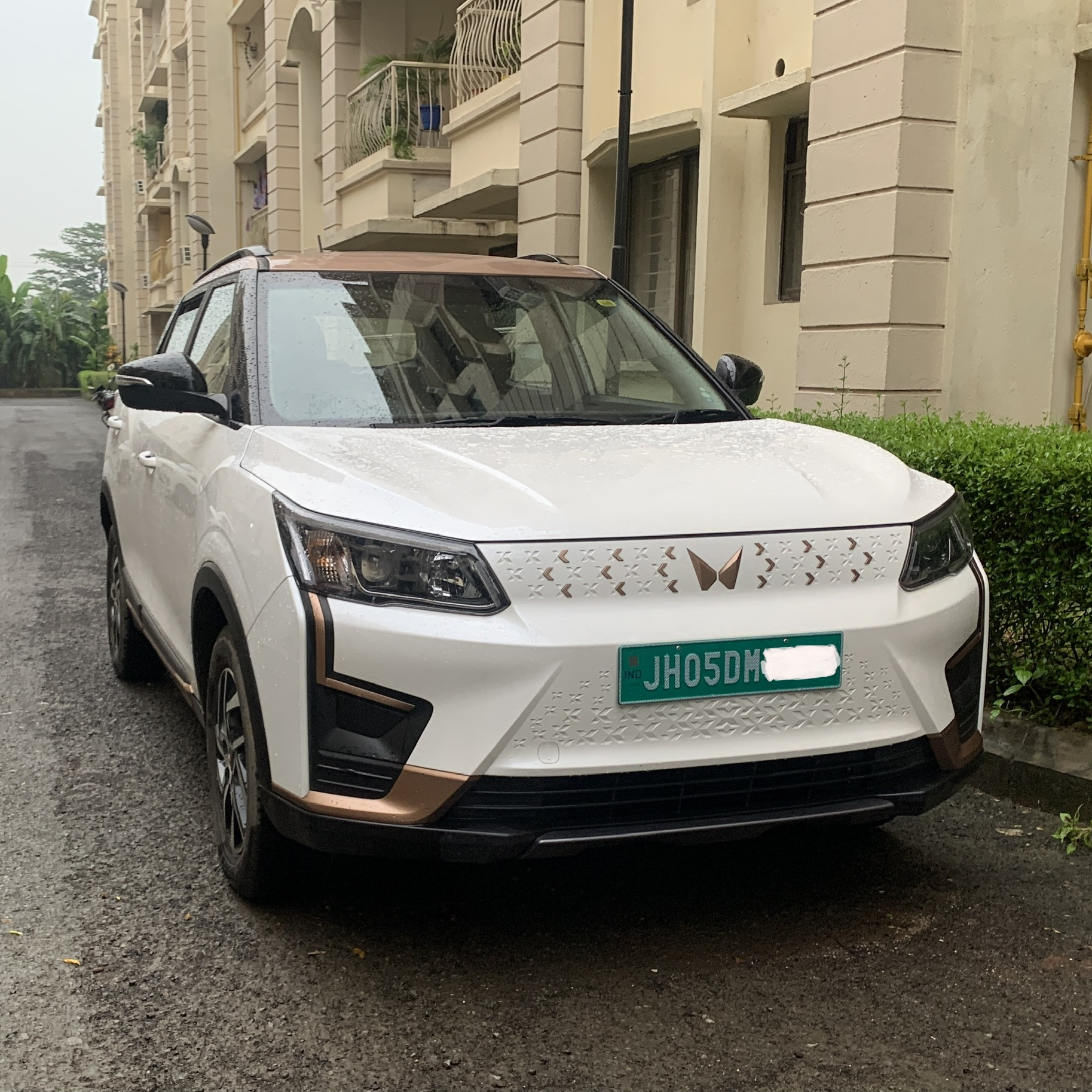
2023 Mahindra XUV 400 EL EV (India)

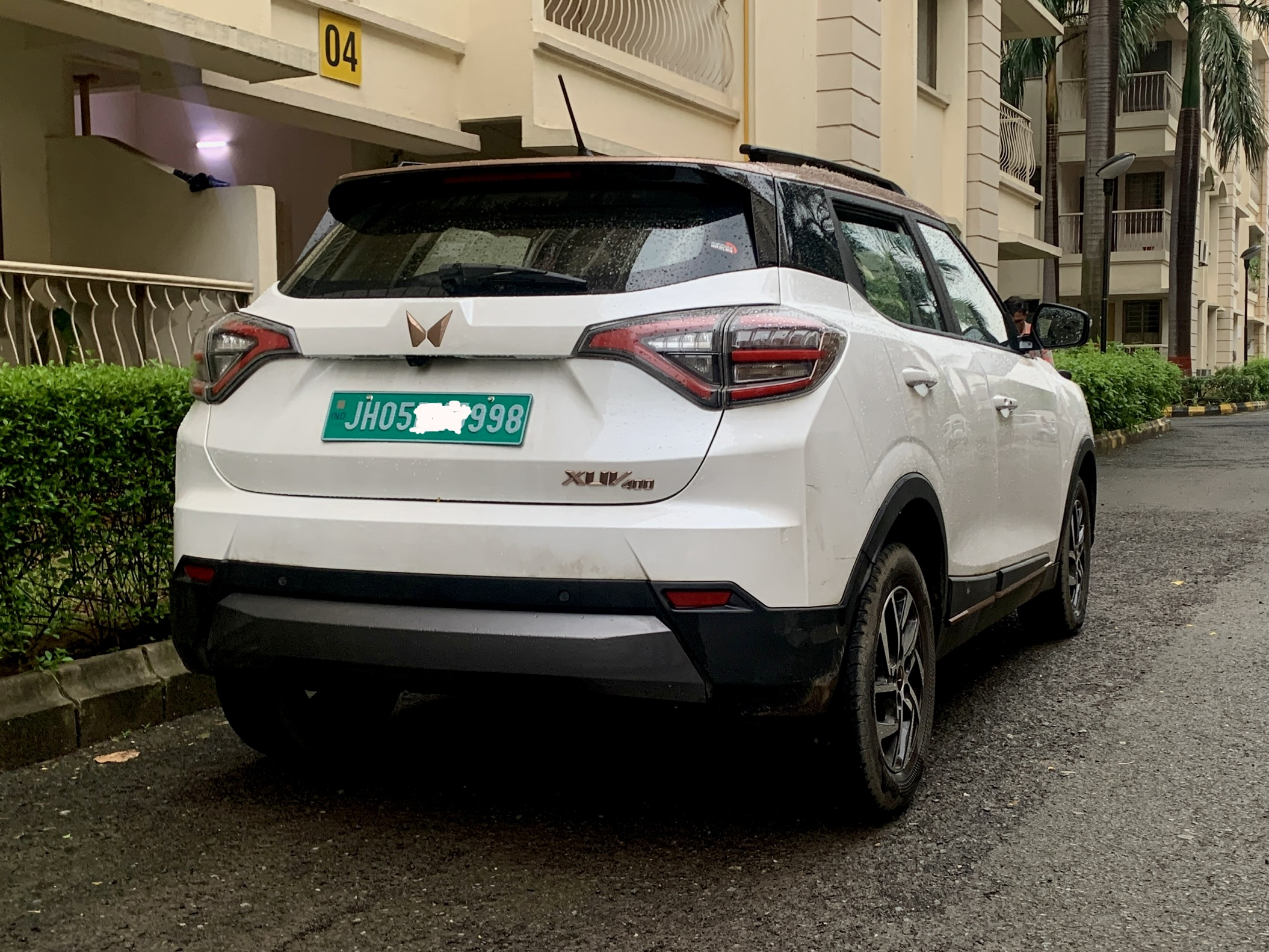
Rear view

== Mahindra XUV 3XO ==
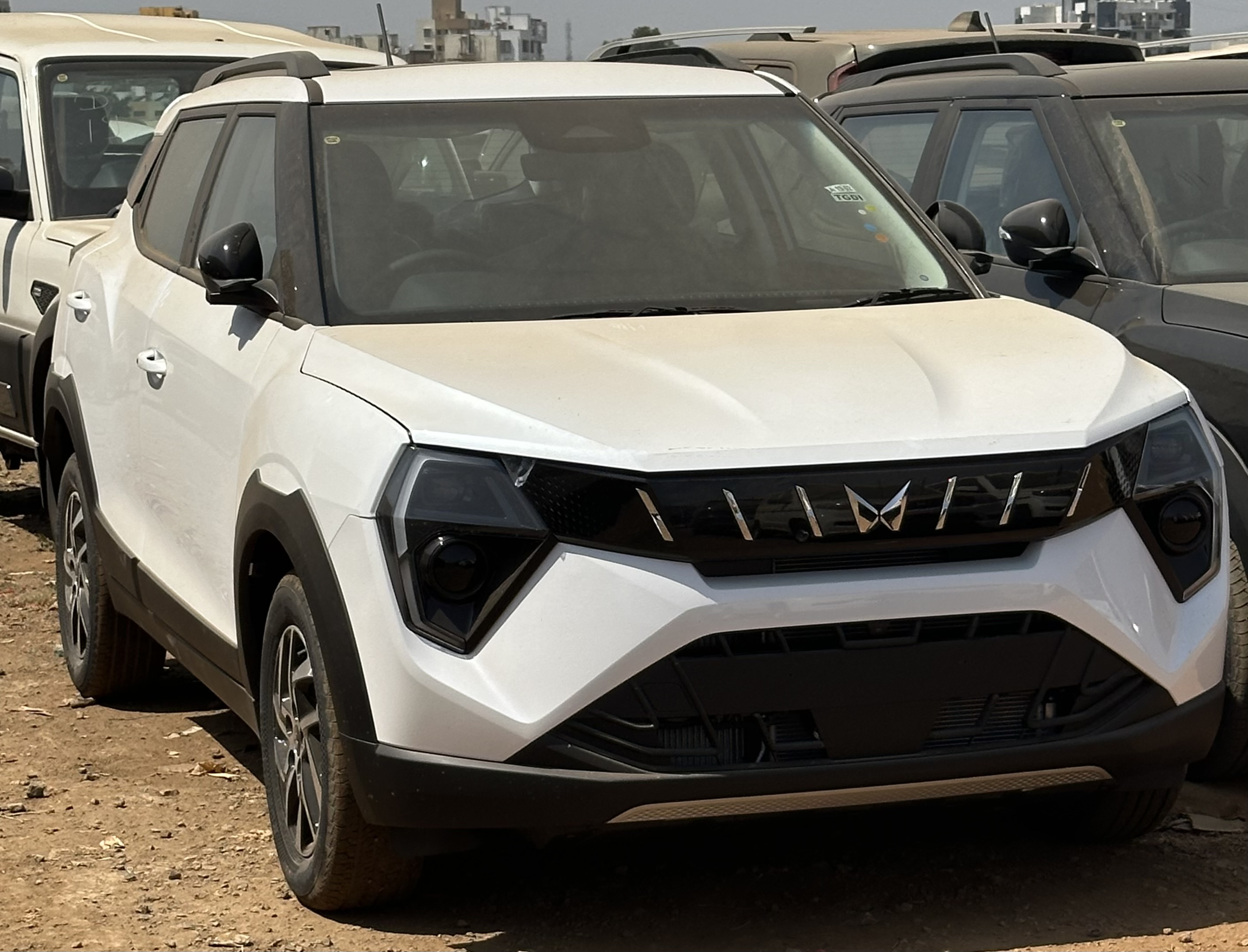
2025 Mahindra 3XO (India)

On 29 April 2024 Mahindra announced the facelifted version of XUV300, named XUV 3XO (code name S220). It retains the same design but some changes which is Front LED Headlamps, 10 inch Touchscreen with AdrenoX, 10.25 inch Instrument cluster, 360-degree camera, Panoramic Sunroof, connected LED Tail lamps and 7 speakers by Harman Kardon. It comes 3 series which is MX, REVX and AdrenoX AX series. MX series is MX1, MX2, MX2 PRO, MX3 MX3 PRO, REVX series is REVX M, REVX M(O), REVX A and AdrenoX AX series is AX5, AX5L AX7 and AX7L. Its electric variant (S240) was launched on 6 January 2026.
