= Mahindra XUV 3XO =

Subcompact crossover SUV

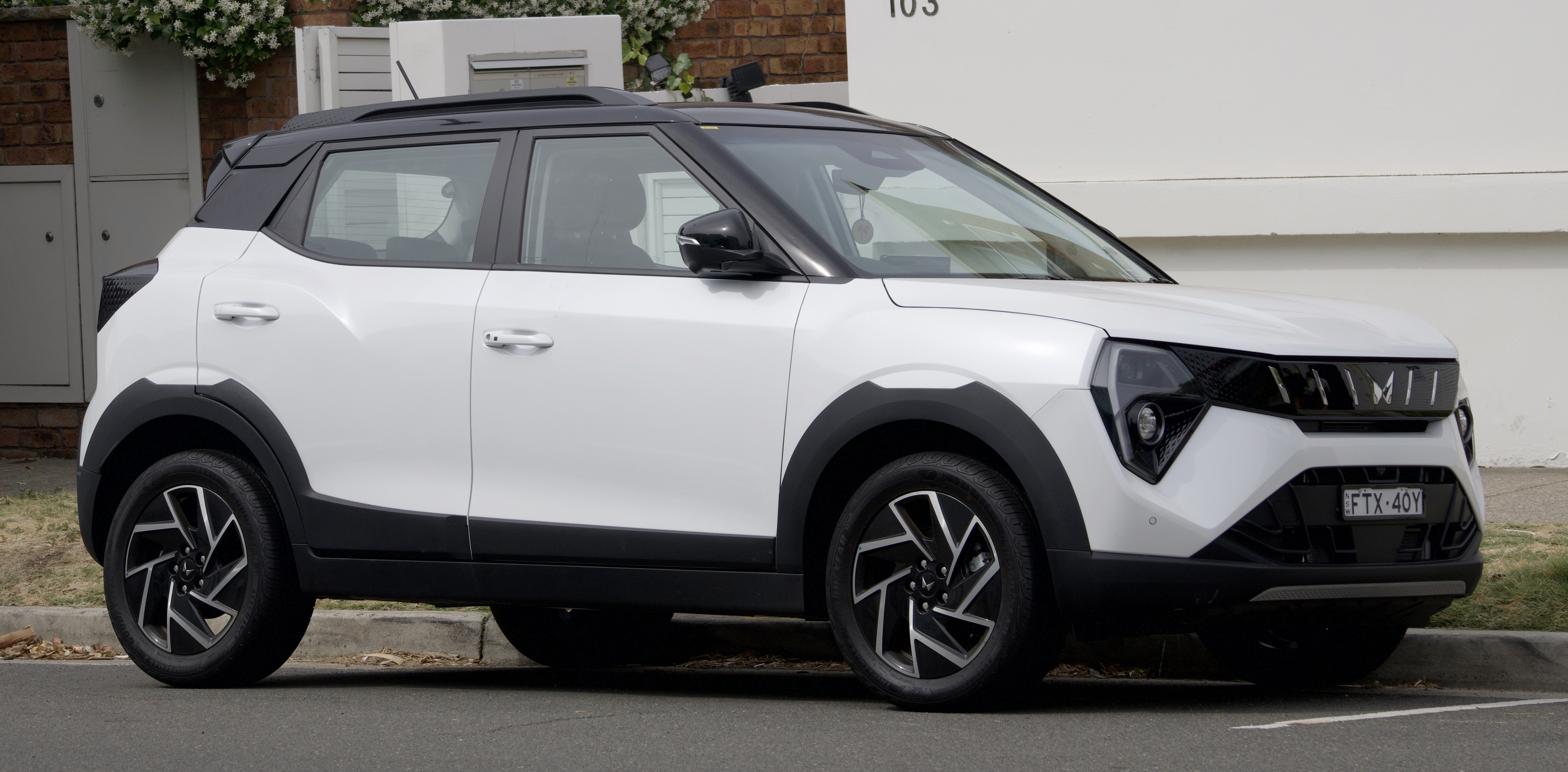
- 2025 Mahindra XUV3XO (Australia)

Overview
- Manufacturer: Mahindra & Mahindra
- Model code: S220
- Production: 2024–present (ICE); 2026–present (Electric)
- Assembly: India: Nashik, Maharashtra

Body and chassis
- Class: Subcompact crossover SUV
- Body style: 5-door SUV
- Layout: Front-engine, front-wheel-drive
- Platform: X100 Platform
- Related: Mahindra XUV300; KGM Tivoli

Powertrain
- Engine: Petrol: 1.2 L mStallion TCMPFi I3 turbo; 1.2 L mStallion T-GDi I3 turbo; Petrol/CNG; 1.2 L mStallion TCMPFi I3 turbo; Diesel: 1.5 L 4D15 CRDe I4 turbo
- Transmission: 6-speed manual 6-speed automated manual 6-speed automatic

Dimensions
- Wheelbase: 2,600 mm (100 in)
- Length: 3,990 mm (157 in)
- Width: 1,821 mm (71.7 in)
- Height: 1,647 mm (64.8 in)
- Kerb weight: Gasoline-1,350 kg, Diesel-1,469 kg

Chronology
- Predecessor: Mahindra XUV300 (pre-facelift)

The Mahindra XUV 3XO is a subcompact crossover SUV produced by the Indian automaker Mahindra & Mahindra, based on the X100 platform of Mahindra XUV300. It has been sold in the Indian market since 29 April 2024. In mid-2024, it also went on sale in South Africa, followed by Australia in July 2025. XUV 3XO is the facelift of the Mahindra XUV300. The electric variant called Mahindra XUV3XO EV was launched on 6 January 2026.

== Overview ==
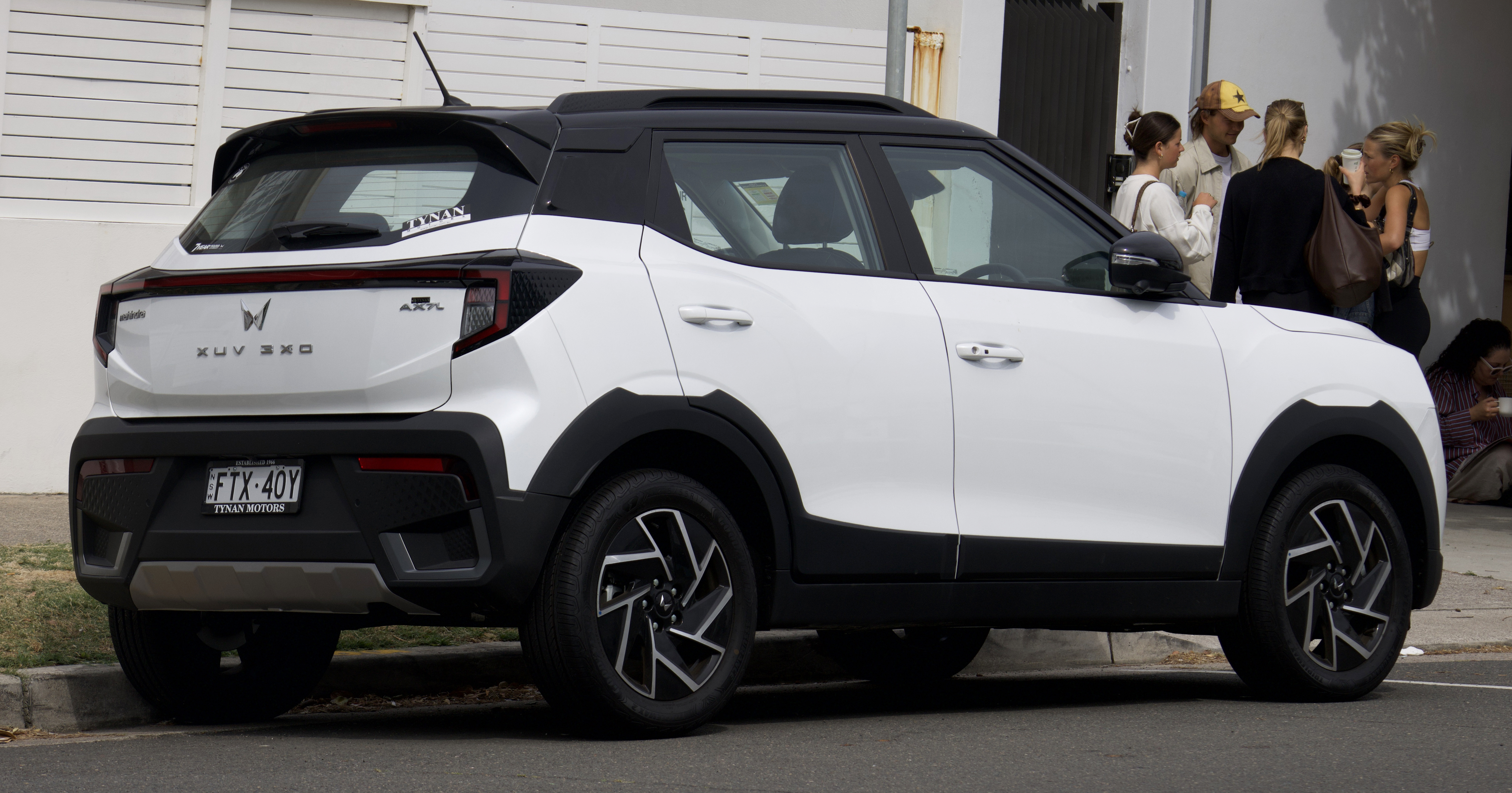
Rear view

The Mahindra XUV 3XO was introduced in April 2024 as a facelift of XUV300 model. The XUV 3XO comes with enhanced engine options, a refreshed design, and new technology features aimed at catering to the needs of both urban and off-road drivers.

== Specifications ==
The XUV 3XO has a seating capacity for 5 passengers and a boot space of 364 litres. It has a 42 litres (11 US gal) fuel tank, and a mini spare wheel. It has a McPherson strut front suspension with an anti-roll bar, and a torsion beam suspension with coil springs in the rear. Its turning radius is 5.3 metres (17 ft).

== Variants ==
A Mahindra XUV 3XO at Royal Meenakshi Mall, Bengaluru (2026)

The XUV 3XO is available in multiple variants:

- MX Series: Includes MX1, MX2, MX2 Pro, MX3, and MX3 Pro.
- AX Series: Includes AX5, AX5 Luxury, AX7, and AX7 Luxury variants.
- REVX Series: Includes REVX M, REVX M(O), and REVX A.

The top-end variant, AX7 Luxury, features a panoramic sunroof, advanced infotainment options, and a full suite of safety features including ADAS.

In Australia, only the AX5L and AX7L variants, all with the Petrol 1.2L TCMPFi engine, are available.

== Powertrain ==
The Mahindra XUV 3XO is available with three engine options, two 1.2 L turbocharged petrol three-cylinders or a 1.5 L turbodiesel four-cylinder. The base engine is a port-injected version of the petrol three-cylinder which produces 82 kW (111 PS; 110 hp) and 200 N⋅m (20.4 kg⋅m; 148 lb⋅ft) of torque. The diesel engine has common rail direct injection and produces 85.8 kW (116.7 PS; 115.1 hp) and 300 N⋅m (30.6 kg⋅m; 221 lb⋅ft) of torque. The direct injected and intercooled petrol engine is only available on higher grades, and outputs 96 kW (131 PS; 129 hp) and 230 N⋅m (23.5 kg⋅m; 170 lb⋅ft) of torque. The petrol engines are offered with a choice of 6-speed manual or an Aisin sourced 6-speed torque converter automatic transmission, while the diesel engine can be had with a 6-speed manual or a 6-speed automated manual transmission marketed as 'AutoSHIFT+'.

Engines
| Engine | Fuel | Power | Torque | ARAI Fuel Consumption (manual/auto) |
|---|---|---|---|---|
| mStallion 1.2 L TCMPFi 3-cylinder | Petrol | 82 kW (111 PS; 110 hp) @5000rpm | 200 N⋅m (20.4 kg⋅m; 148 lb⋅ft) @1500-3500rpm | 18.89 km/L (44.4 mpg_{‑US}; 5.29 L/100 km)/17.96 km/L (42.2 mpg_{‑US}; 5.57 L/100 km) |
| mStallion 1.2 L TGDi intercooled 3-cylinder | Petrol | 96 kW (131 PS; 129 hp) @5000rpm | 230 N⋅m (23.5 kg⋅m; 170 lb⋅ft) @1500-3750rpm | 20.1 km/L (47 mpg_{‑US}; 5.0 L/100 km)/18.2 km/L (43 mpg_{‑US}; 5.5 L/100 km) |
| 4D15 1.5 L CRDe 4-cylinder | Diesel | 85.8 kW (116.7 PS; 115.1 hp) @3750rpm | 300 N⋅m (30.6 kg⋅m; 221 lb⋅ft) @1500-2500rpm | 20.6 km/L (48 mpg_{‑US}; 4.9 L/100 km)/21.2 km/L (50 mpg_{‑US}; 4.7 L/100 km) |

== Features ==
The XUV 3XO is equipped with a host of features, including:

- Interior: Panoramic sunroof, dual-zone climate control, two 10.25-inch displays for infotainment and driver’s display, wireless charging, and a cooled glove box.
- Exterior: LED projector headlamps, C-shaped LED DRLs, and a bold front grille with chrome accents.
- Safety: Six airbags, Anti-lock Braking System (ABS) with Electronic Brakeforce Distribution (EBD), Electronic Stability Control (ESC), and a suite of Level 2 Advanced Driver Assistance Systems (ADAS) like adaptive cruise control and lane-keeping assist.

== Safety ==
The XUV 3XO for India was rated 5 stars for both adults and infants by Bharat NCAP in 2024 (based on Latin NCAP 2016).

Bharat NCAP test results Mahindra XUV 3XO (2024, based on Latin NCAP 2016)
| Test | Score | Stars |
|---|---|---|
| Adult occupant protection | 29.36/32.00 | 5 /5 stars |
| Child occupant protection | 43.00/49.00 | 5 /5 stars |
