= KGM Tivoli =

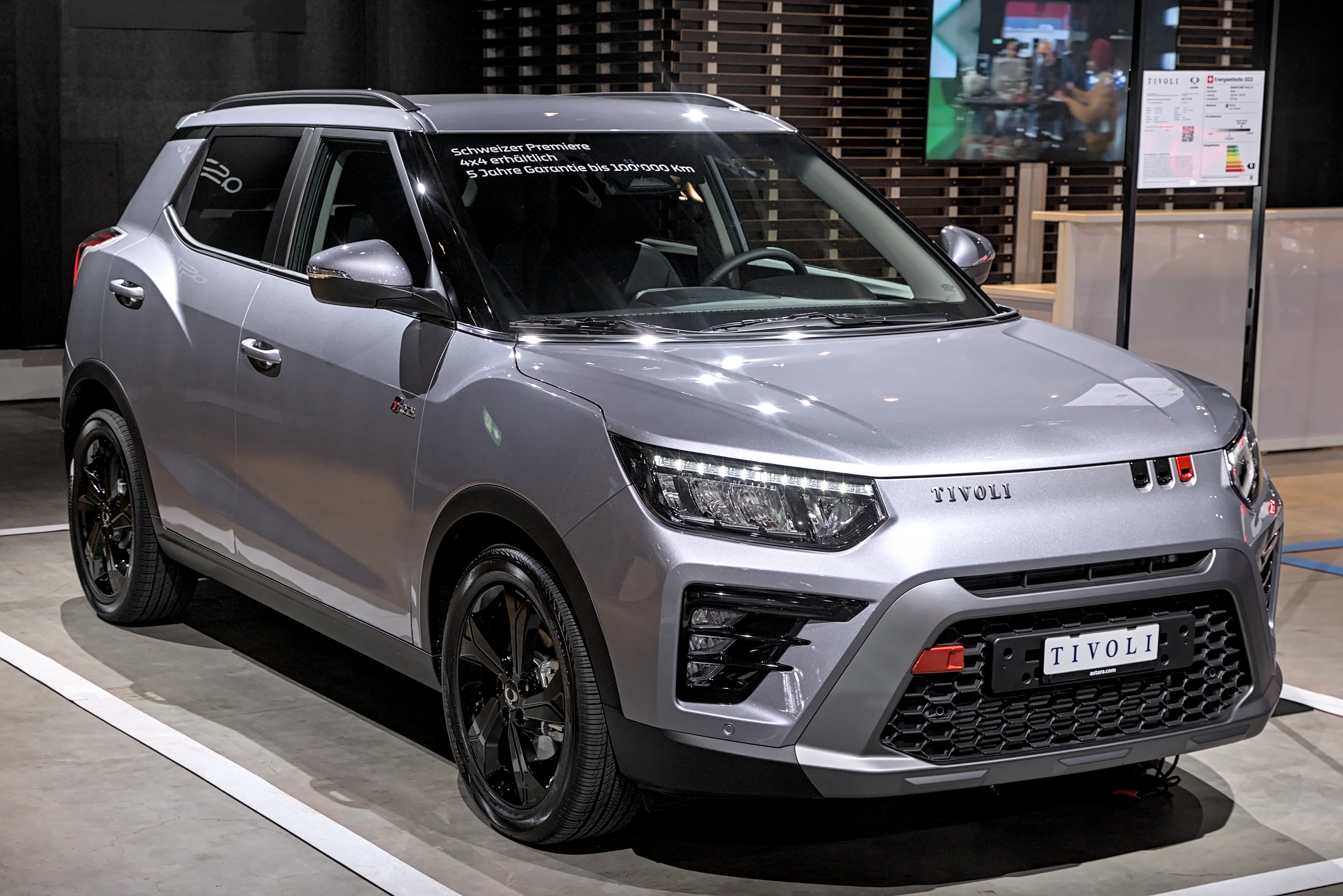

Overview
- Manufacturer: SsangYong Motor (2015–2023); KGM (2023–present)
- Also called: SsangYong Tivoli XLV; SsangYong Tivoli Air (South Korea); SsangYong Tivoli Grand; SsangYong Tivolan (China); SsangYong LUVi (Denmark)
- Production: 2015–present
- Assembly: Pyeongtaek, Gyeonggi Province, South Korea (SsangYong Motor Company); Saveh, Iran (Noora Motor Pars); Chakan, Maharashtra, India (Mahindra)

Body and chassis
- Class: Subcompact SUV (B-segment)
- Body style: 5-door SUV
- Layout: Front-engine, front-wheel-drive Front-engine, four-wheel-drive
- Related: Mahindra XUV300; Mahindra XUV400; Mahindra XUV 3XO

Powertrain
- Engine: 1.2 L e-XGi120T T-GDI I3 (petrol); 1.5 L e-XGi150T T-GDI I4 (petrol); 1.6 L e-XGi160 I4 (petrol); 1.6 L e-XDi160 I4-T (diesel)
- Transmission: 6-speed manual 6-speed Aisin automatic

Dimensions
- Wheelbase: 2,600 mm (102.4 in)
- Length: 4,195 mm (165.2 in) (pre-facelift); 4,225 mm (166.3 in) (facelift); 4,440 mm (174.8 in) (XLV)
- Width: 1,795 mm (70.7 in) (pre-facelift); 1,810 mm (71.3 in) (facelift); 1,798 mm (70.8 in) (XLV)
- Height: 1,590 mm (62.6 in) (pre-facelift); 1,613 mm (63.5 in) (facelift); 1,605 mm (63.2 in) (XLV)
- Curb weight: 1,300 kg (2,900 lb) (petrol); 1,390 kg (3,060 lb) (diesel); 1,425 kg (3,142 lb) (XLV FWD); 1,535 kg (3,384 lb) (XLV AWD)

The KGM Tivoli (Korean: KGM 티볼리), previously SsangYong Tivoli, is a subcompact SUV made by the KG Mobility (previously SsangYong Motor). The Tivoli was SsangYong's first new model under Mahindra & Mahindra ownership. It is named after the Italian town of Tivoli, Lazio, and was chosen because it can be read as "I lov[e] it" in reverse.

== History ==
The Tivoli was in testing and development for the three years prior to its announcement in November 2014 and was revealed in concept with the project name X100. It was launched in South Korea in January 2015.

The Tivoli is offered with a choice of petrol or diesel 1.6-liter engines and is available in two or four-wheel drive. It is equipped with a six-speed manual or AISIN automatic gearbox, which SsangYong claims is as quick and efficient as a dual-clutch setup.

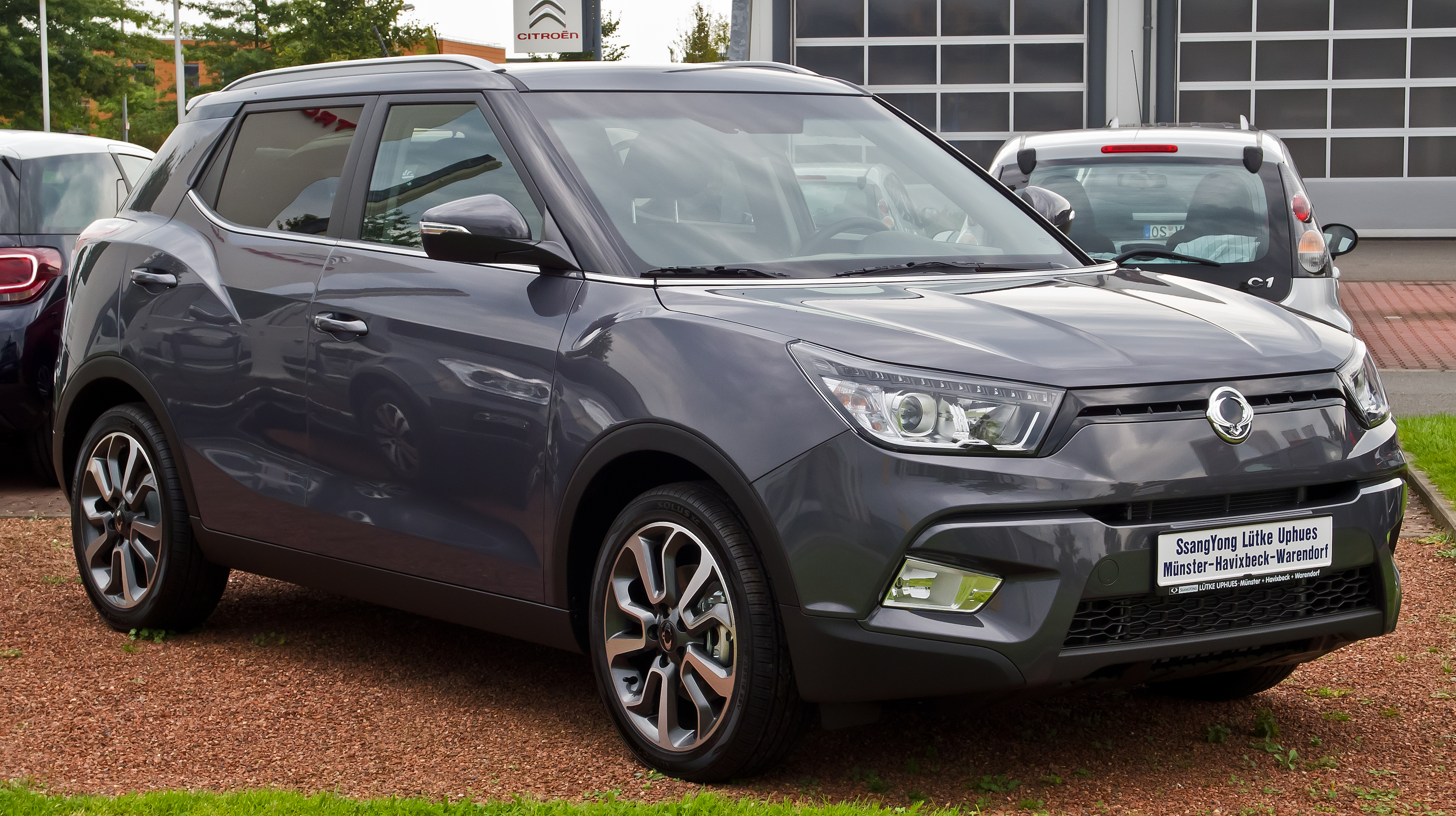
SsangYong Tivoli Front (pre-facelift)

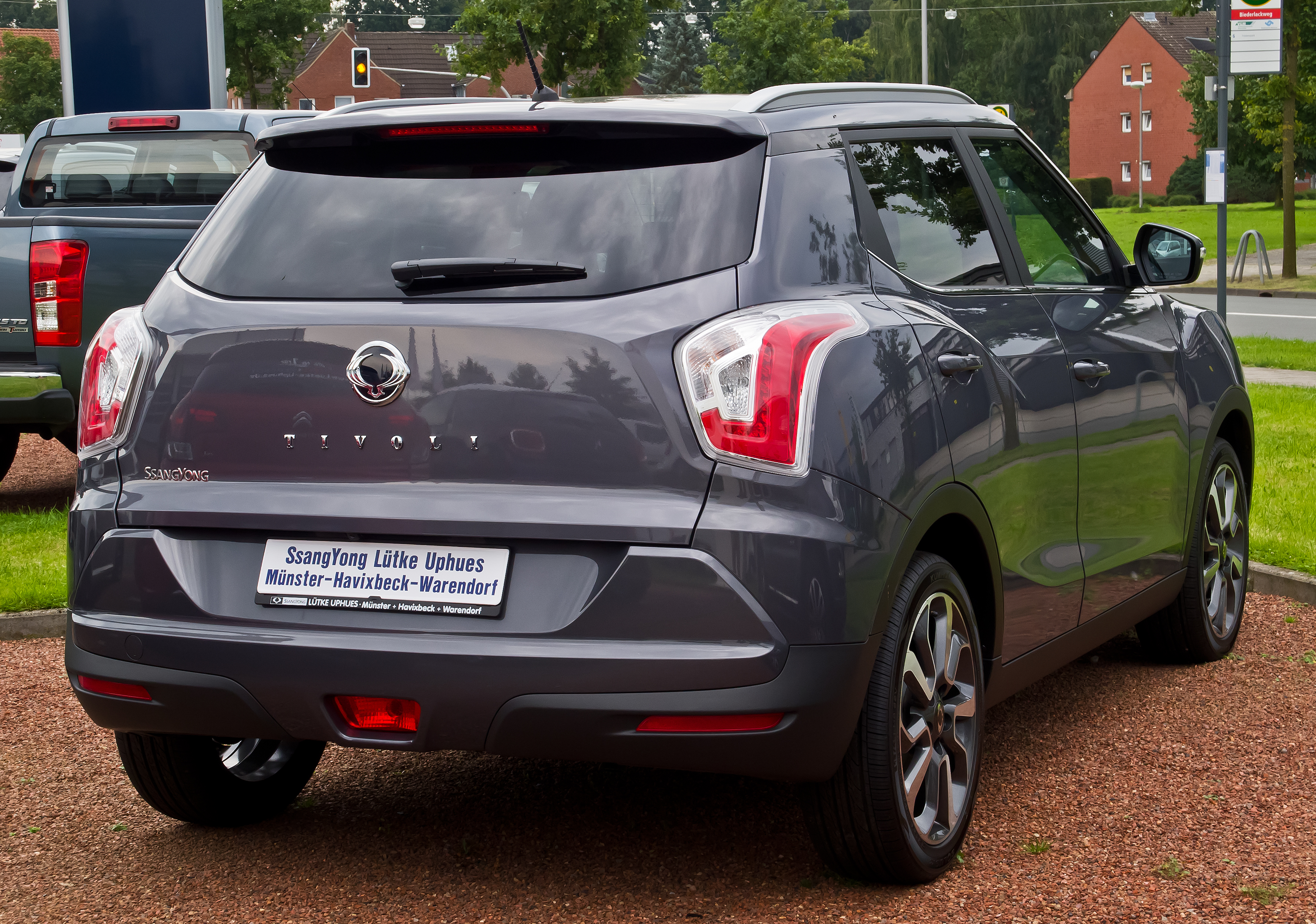
SsangYong Tivoli Rear (pre-facelift)

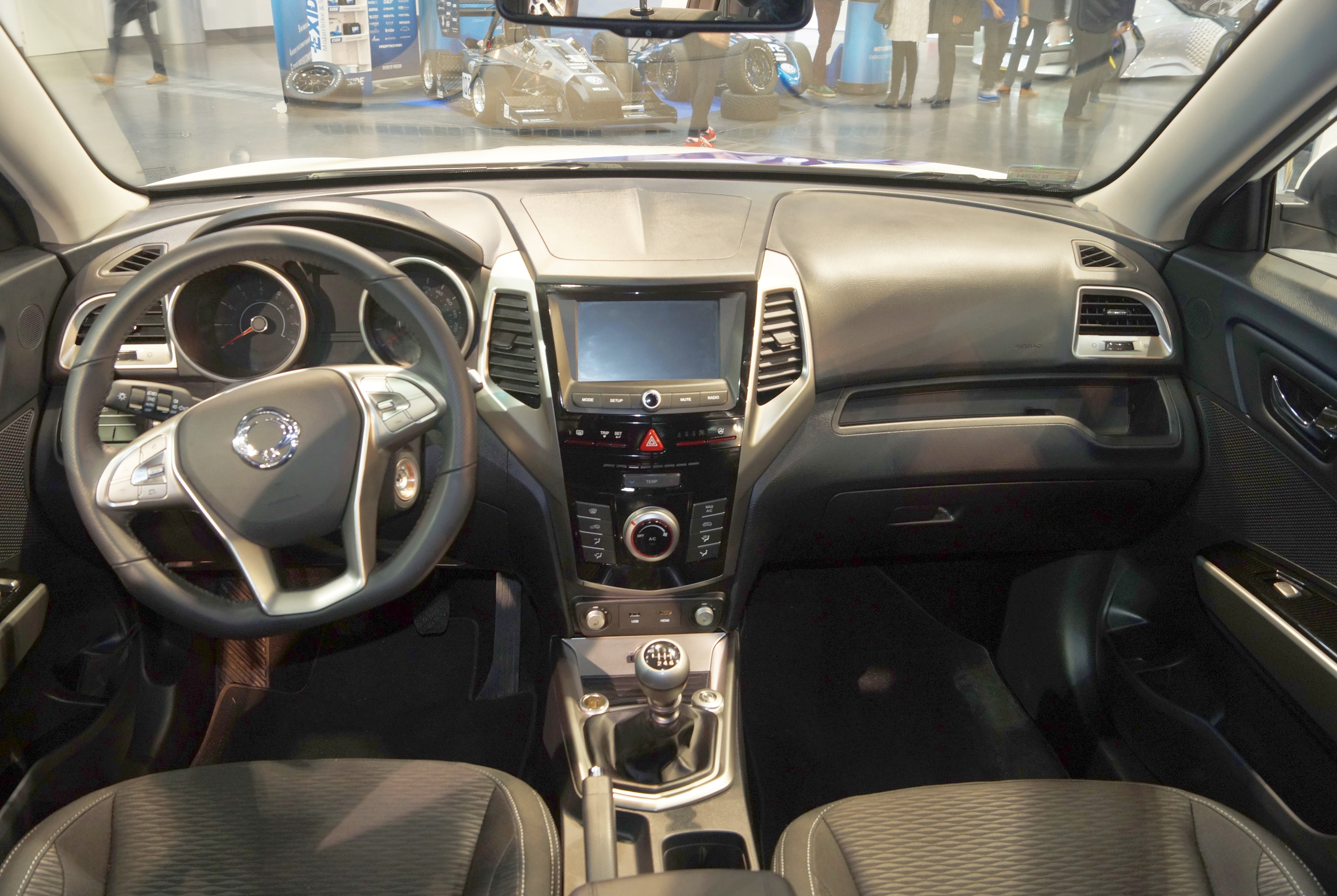
SsangYong Tivoli Interior (pre-facelift)

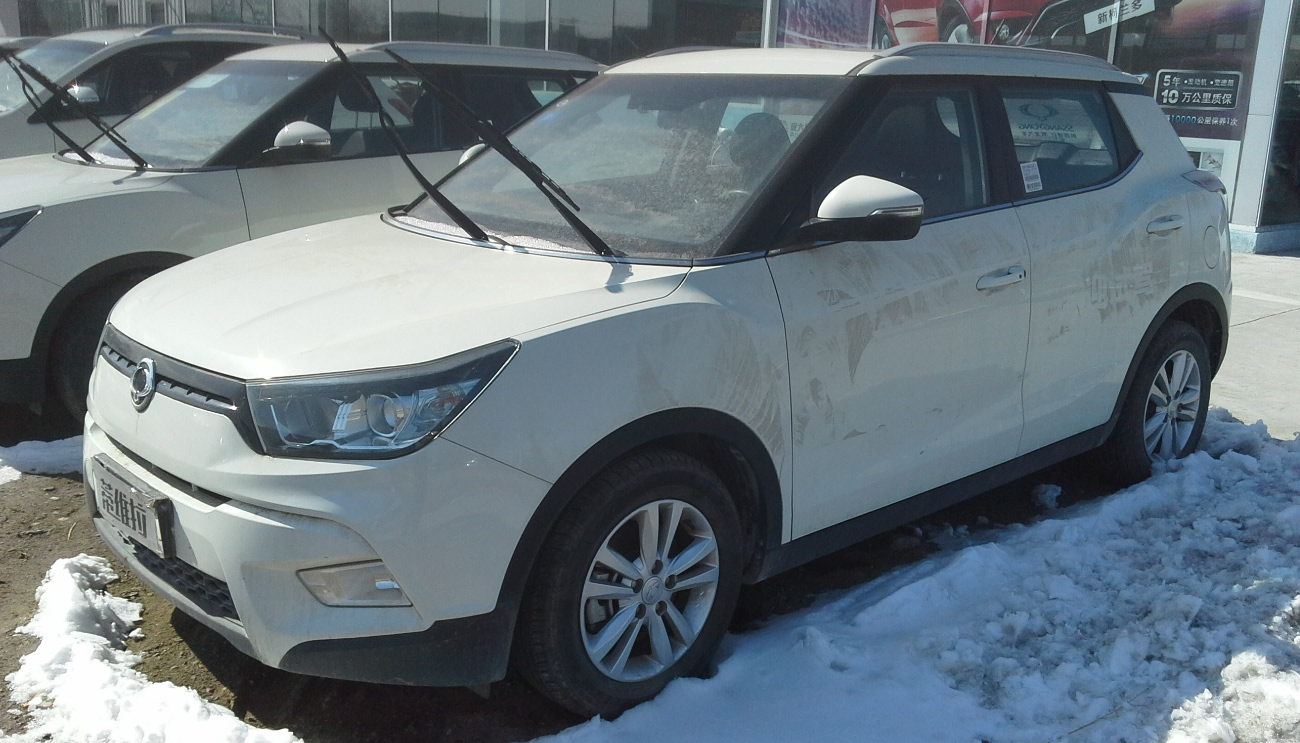
Sangyong Tivolan (China)

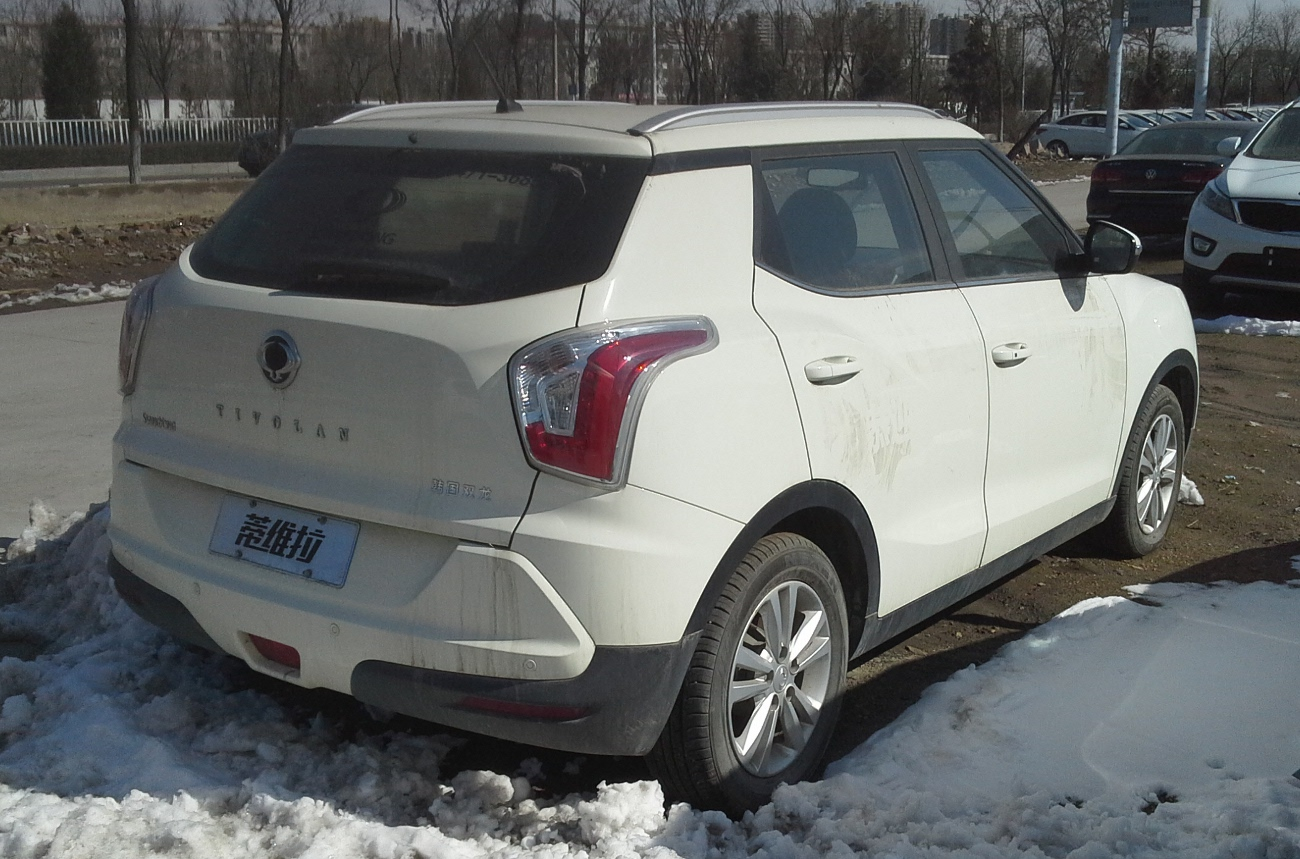
Rear view

=== Facelift ===
In May 2019, SsangYong revealed a teaser image and main specs of the first facelift of the Tivoli. The new version of the car was launched on June 4 in South Korea.

The facelifted Tivoli received a new exterior design, including new LED headlights, fog lights and new taillight graphics. The dashboard also reshaped, with a new centre stack, air vents, a 10.25-inch digital instrument cluster, and a 9.0-inch central infotainment system compatible with Apple CarPlay and Android Auto.

The updated Tivoli features a new 1.5-liter turbo petrol engine, which will replace the existing 1.6-liter petrol engine.

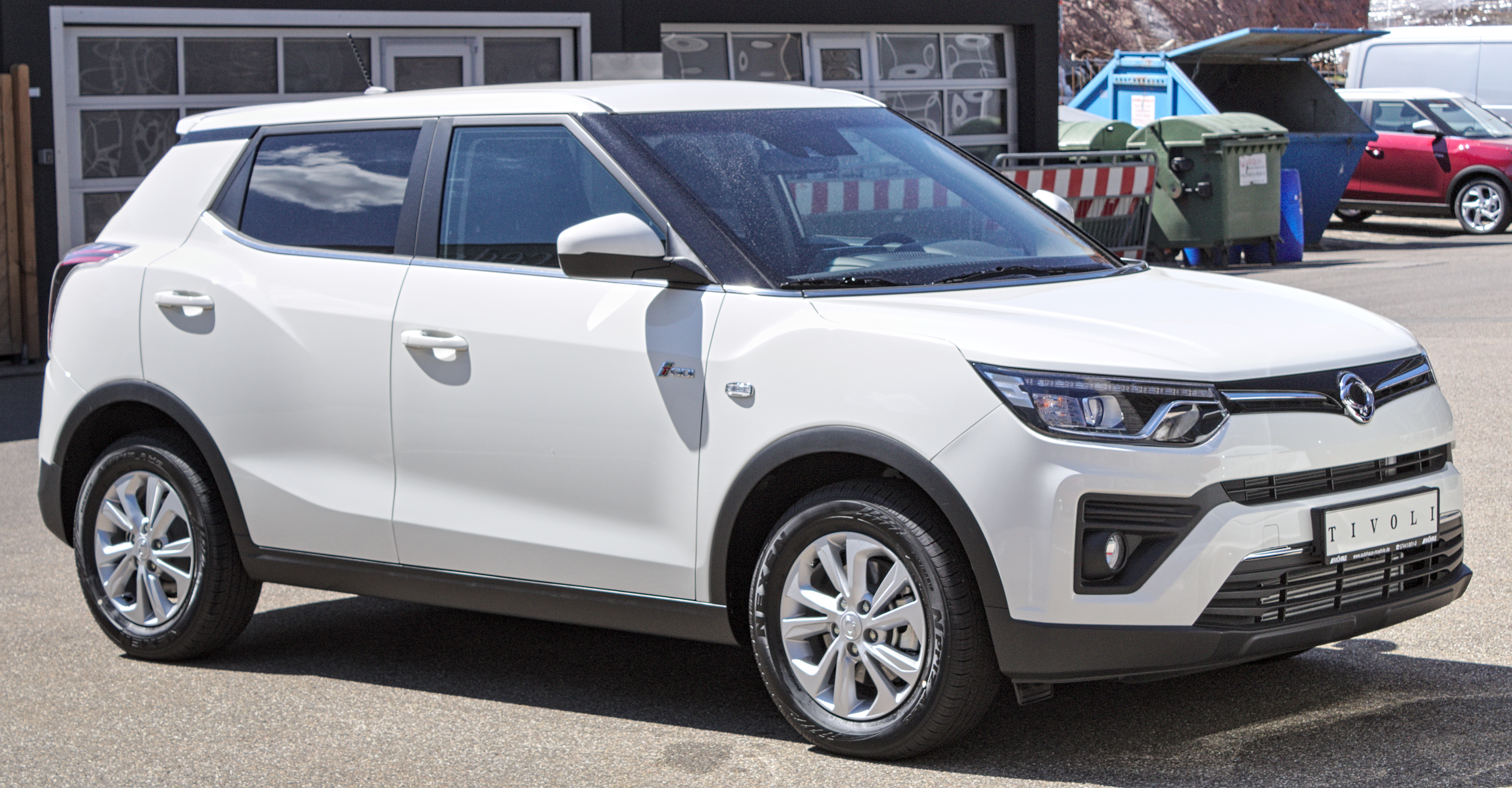
SsangYong Tivoli Front (facelift)

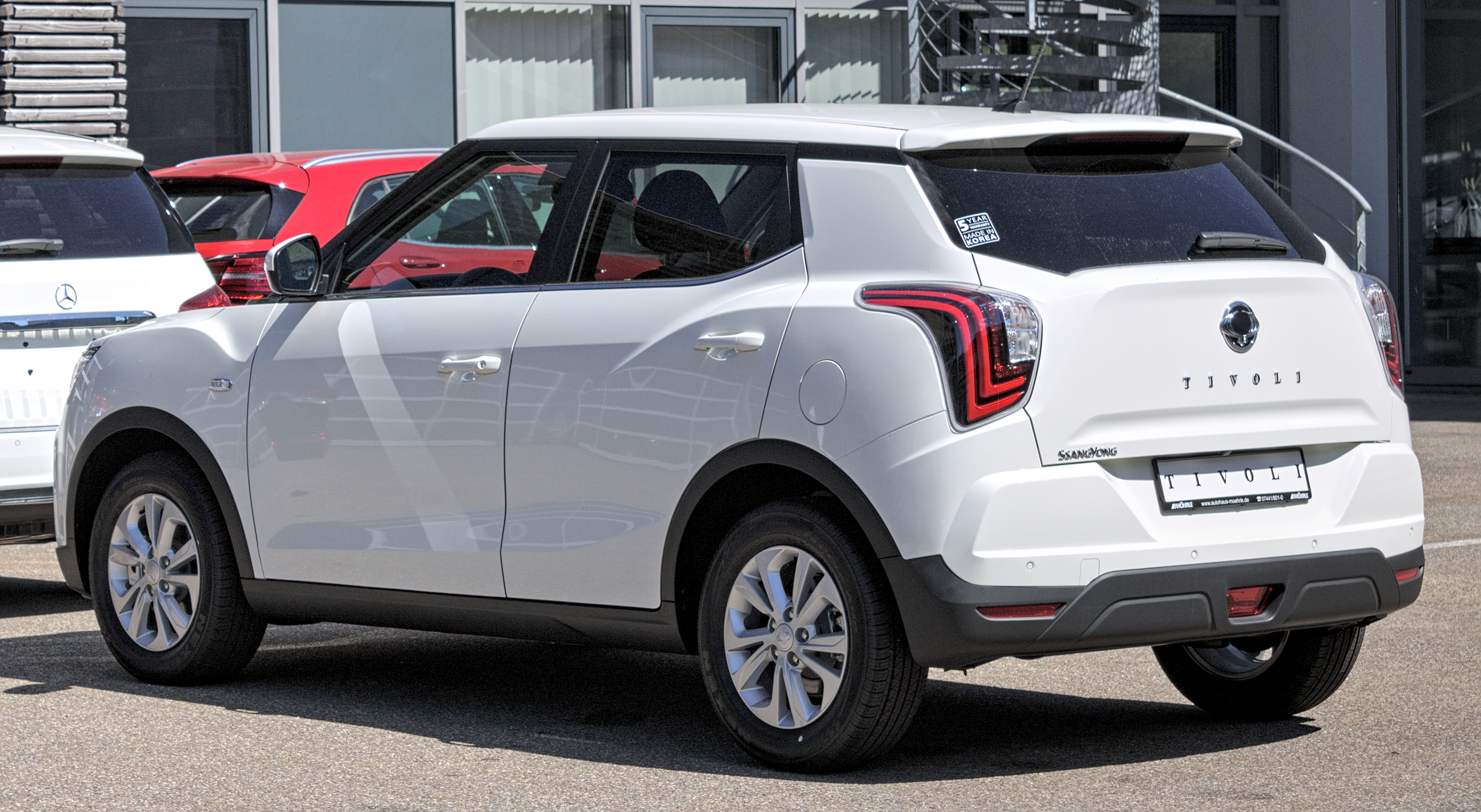
SsangYong Tivoli Rear (facelift)

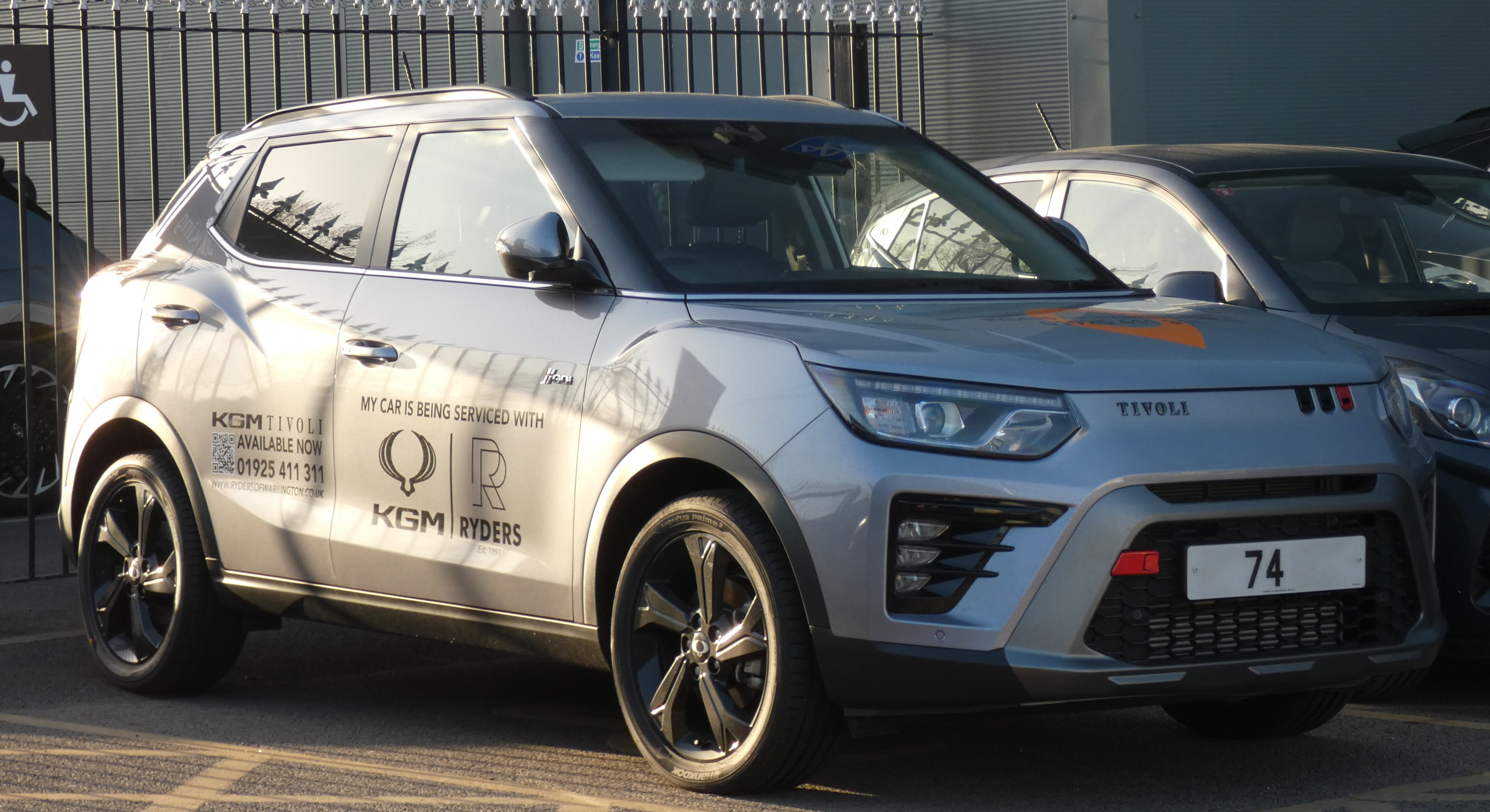
KGM Tivoli front (2nd facelift)

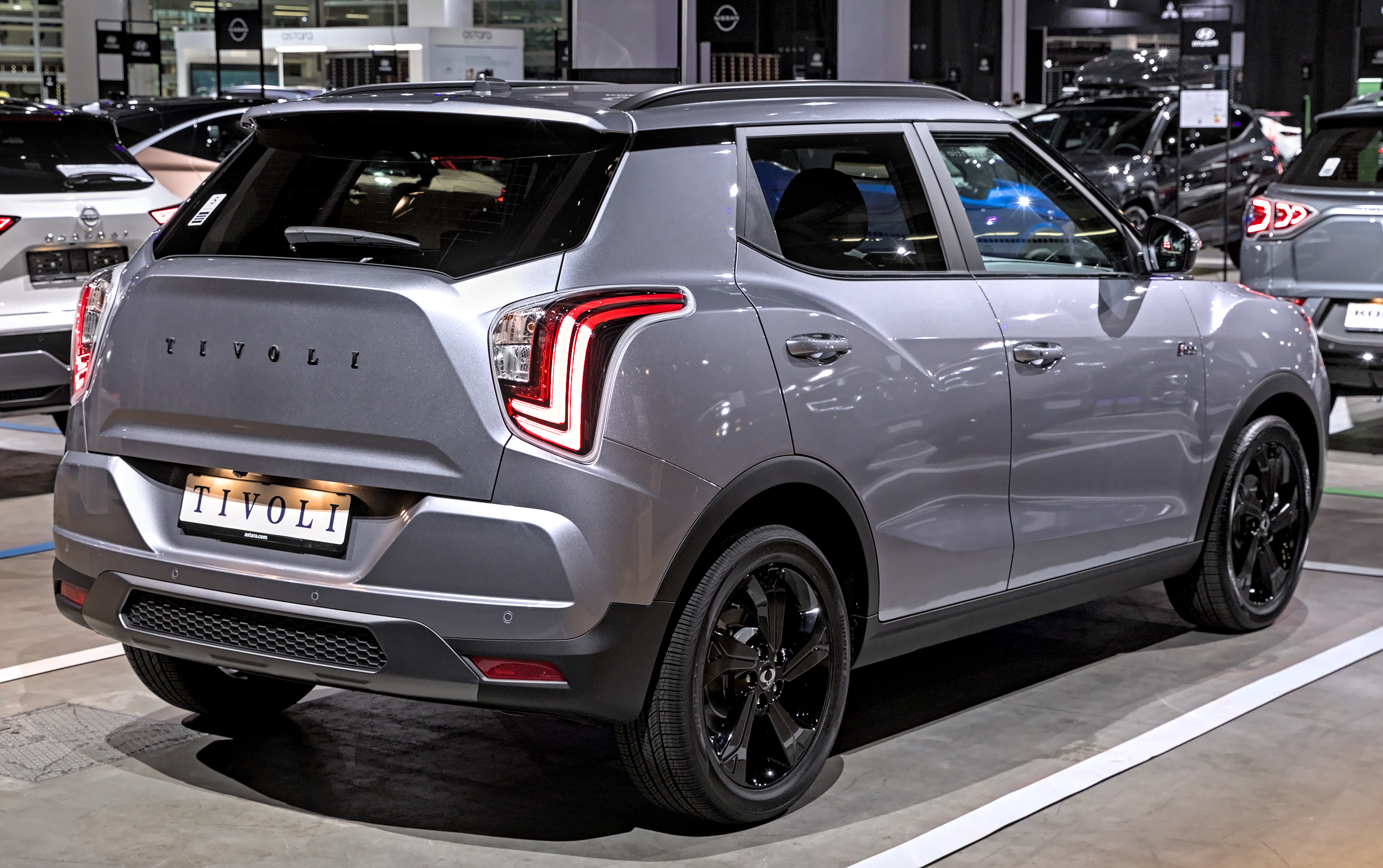
Rear view

== Tivoli XLV ==
The KGM Tivoli XLV (sold in South Korea as the KGM Tivoli Air) is an extended version of the Tivoli. It is lengthened behind the rear wheels by 245 mm (9.6 in), increasing the rear storage space from 423 to 720 liters. The XLV is offered with all-wheel drive and a 1.6-liter diesel engine.

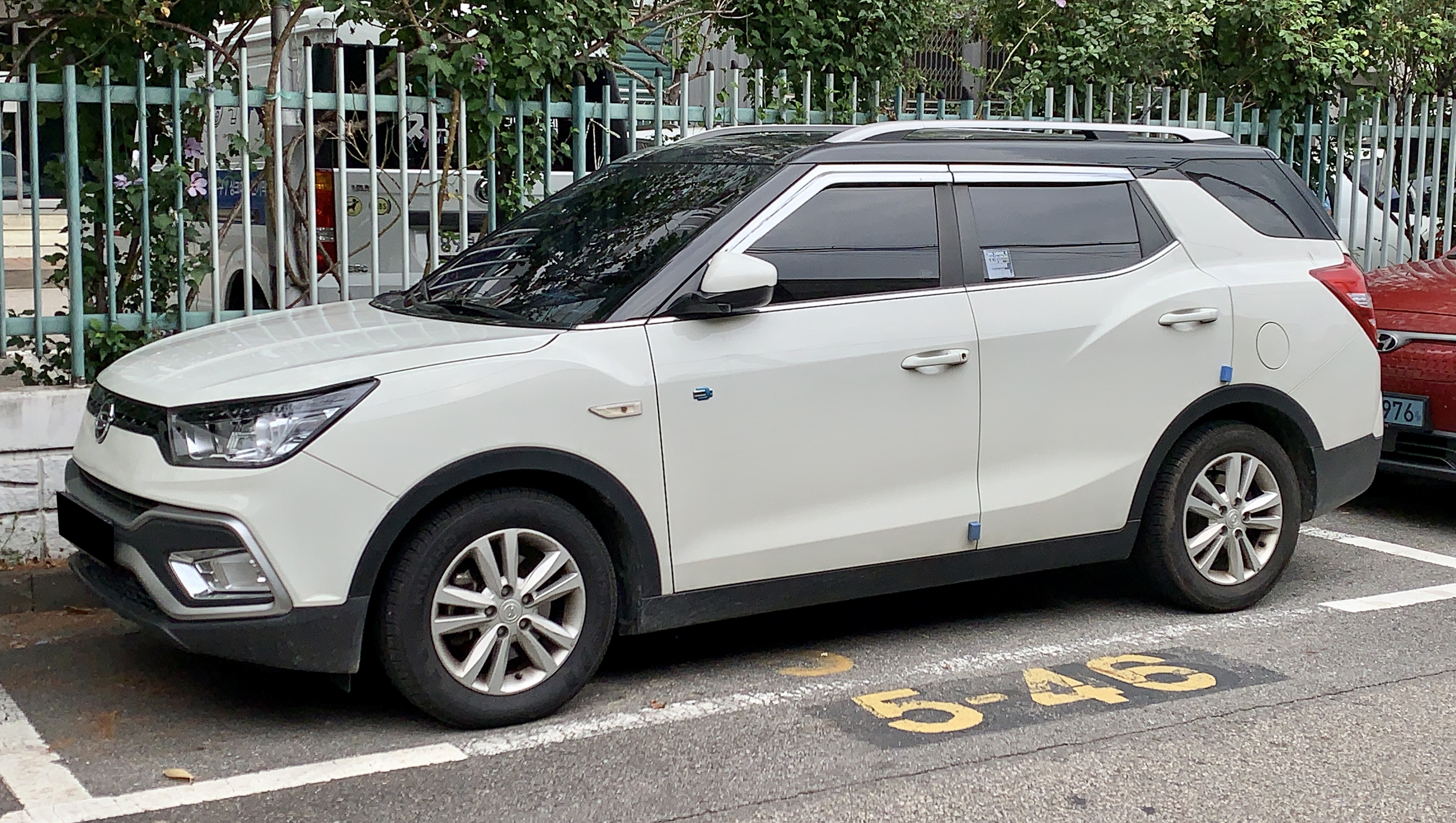
SsangYong Tivoli XLV Front

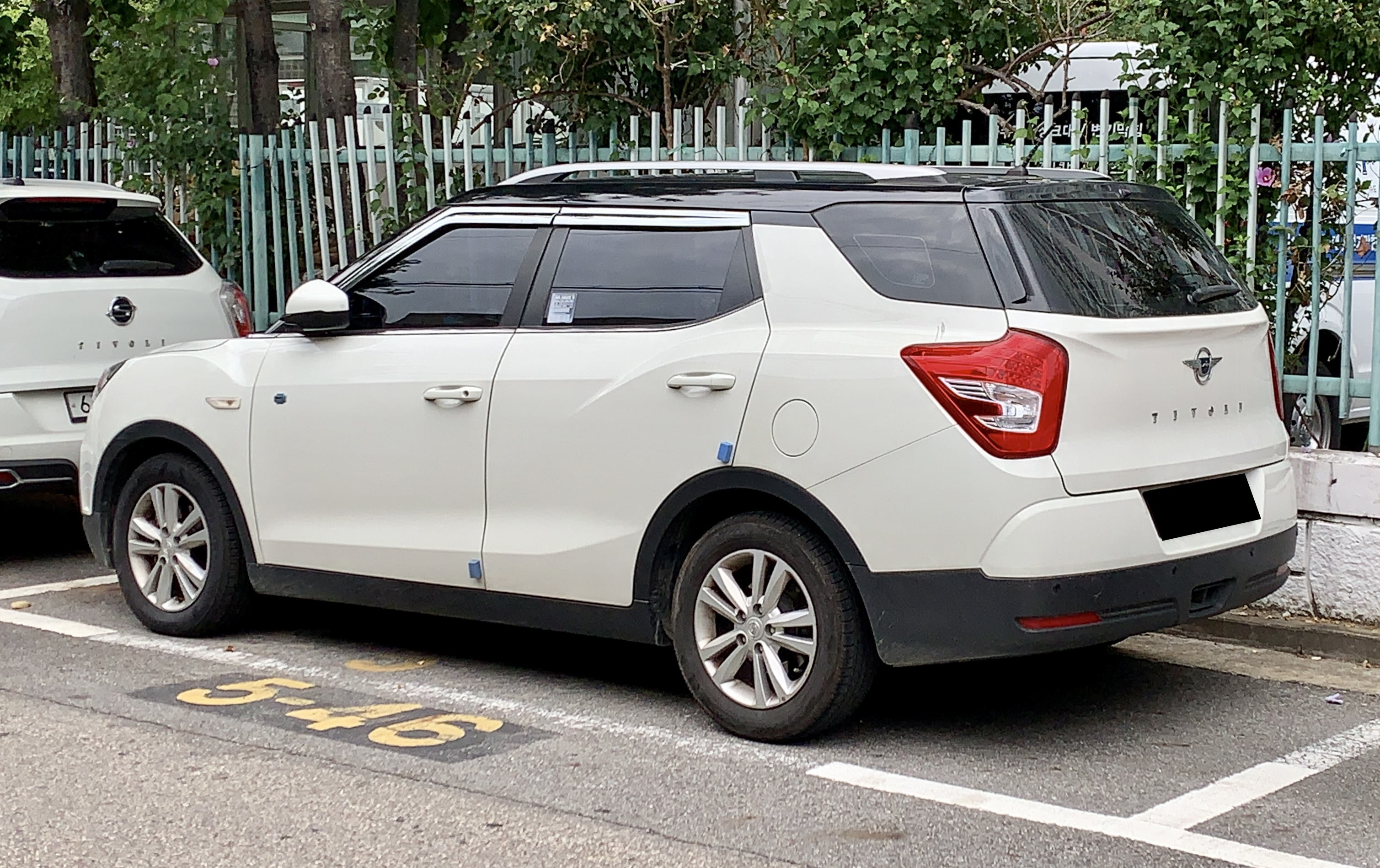
SsangYong Tivoli XLV Rear

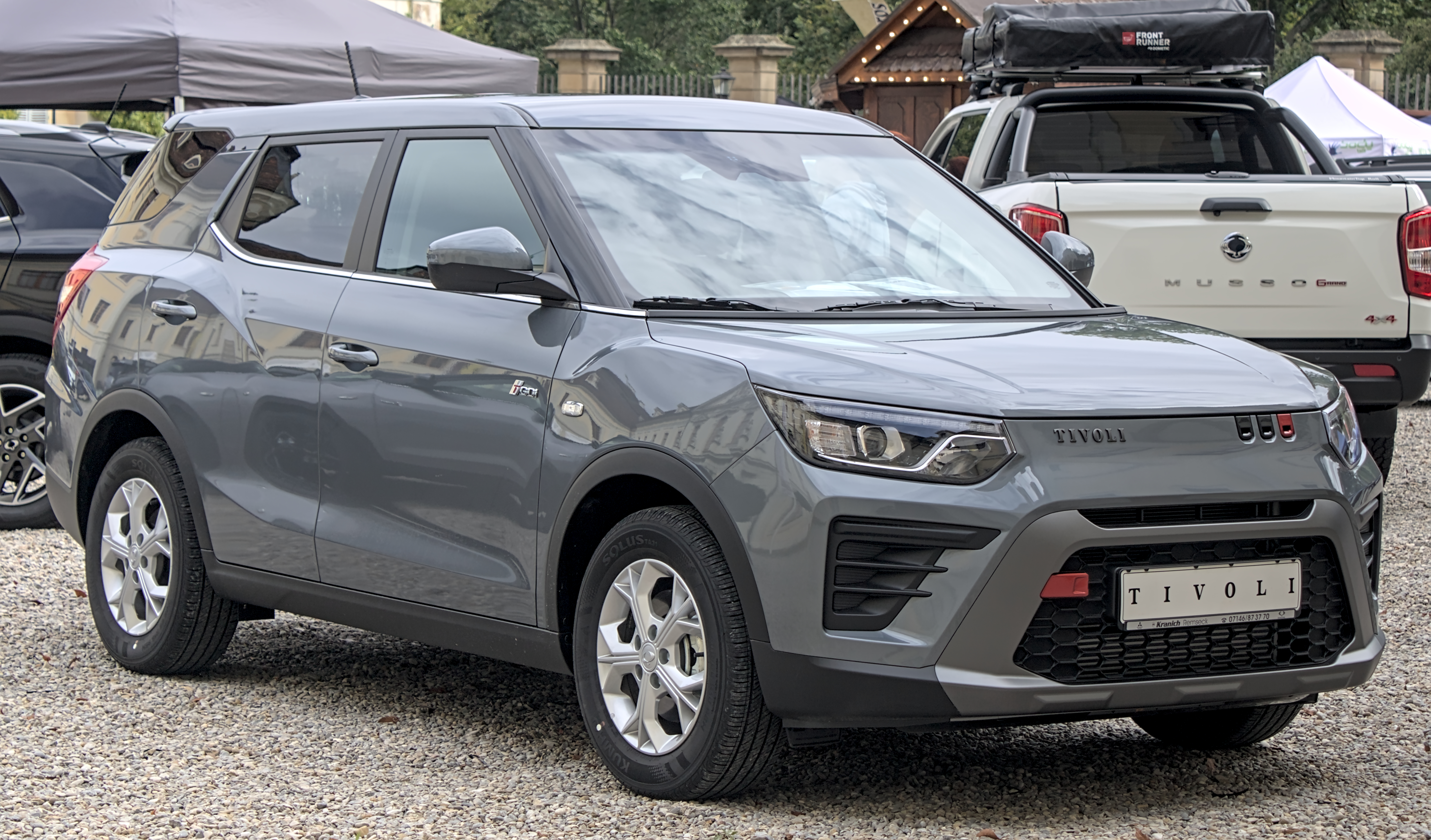
KGM Tivoli XLV front (2nd facelift)

== Safety ==
The Tivoli equipped with seven airbags, including a driver knee-airbag. It also features smart safety driving system including Autonomous Emergency Brake System, (AEBS), Forward Collision Warning System (FCWS), Lane Departure Warning System (LDWS), Lane Keeping Assist System (LKAS), High Beam Assist (HBA), and Traffic Sign Recognition (TSR).

=== KNCAP ===
In Korean New Car Assessment Program (KNCAP) the SsangYong Tivoli received top safety rating of Grade 1 (5 stars; 91.9 pts.) on a 2015 registration.

=== Euro NCAP ===
The rating for the SsangYong Tivoli was first published in 2016. At that time, autonomous emergency braking was sold as an option, as part of a safety pack, and Euro NCAP published two ratings: one with only standard equipment and another with the safety pack. Since February 2018, the content of the safety pack - AEB City, AEB Inter-urban and AEB Pedestrian - has been made standard equipment and the rating has been changed to reflect this change.

Euro NCAP test results for a LHD, 5-door hatchback variant with standard equipment on a 2016 registration:

Euro NCAP test results SsangYong Tivoli w/ standard equipment (2016)
Test	Points	%
Overall:	4 /5 stars	
Adult occupant:	31.3	82%
Child occupant:	30.4	62%
Pedestrian:	27.4	65%
Safety assist:	5.2	43%

=== ANCAP ===
ANCAP test results Ssangyong Tivoli / Tivoli XLV (2016)
Test	Score
Overall	4 /5 stars
Frontal offset	
Side impact	
Pole	
Seat belt reminders	
Whiplash protection	
Pedestrian protection	
Electronic stability control	

== Awards ==
In 2015, the Tivoli selected as the Safe car of the year by the Ministry of Land, Infrastructure and Transport of South Korea.

In 2016, The car was chosen as the Family Car of the Year by VAB, the largest automobile association in Belgium, despite SsangYong being a relatively unknown brand selling only 619 cars in Belgium throughout 2014, representing a market share of 0.13%.

== Motorsport ==
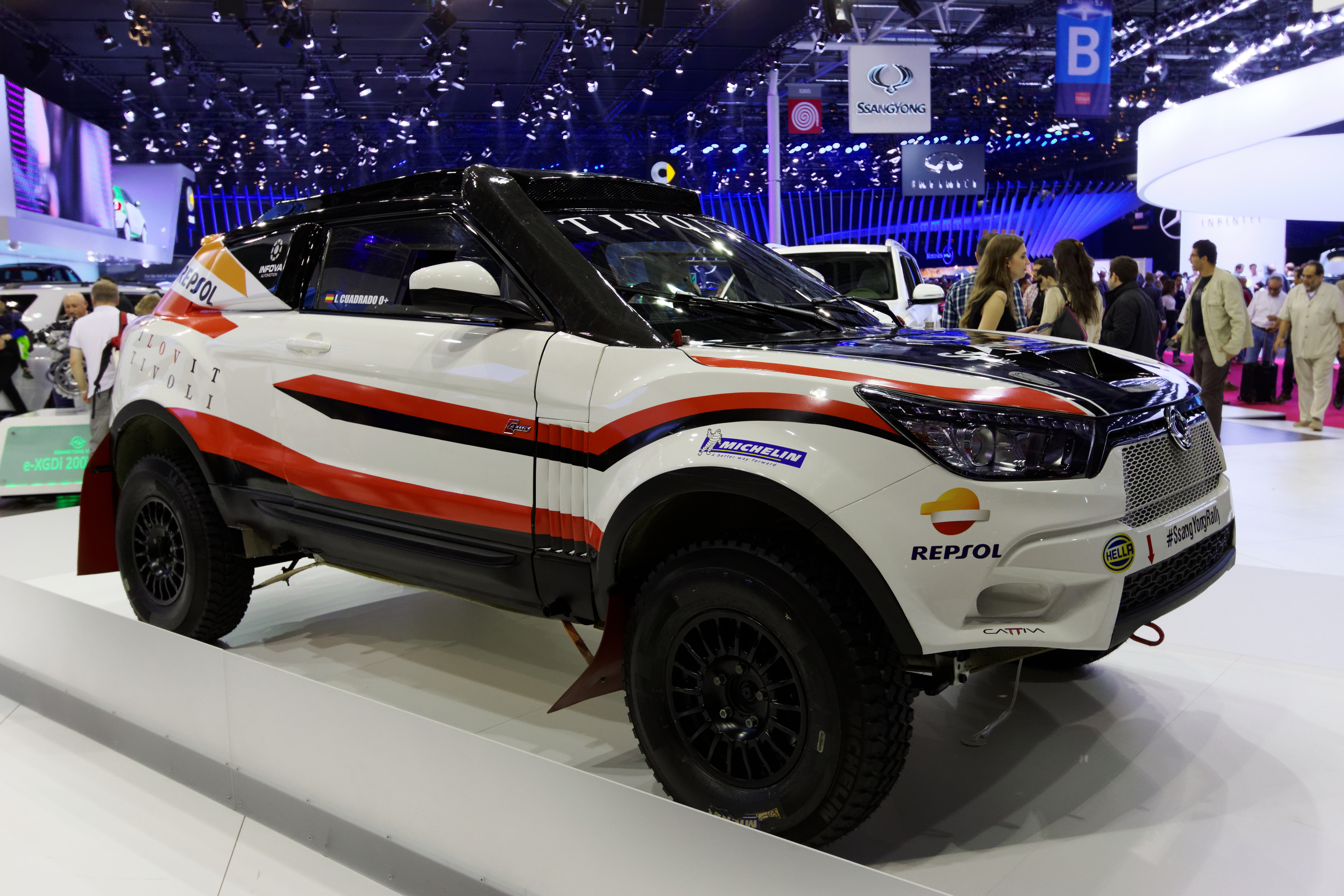
Tivoli rally raid

In Dakar 2018, Óscar Fuertes and co-driver Diego Vallejo entered rally with a Tivoli DKR. The car incorporates V8 engine with maximum power of 405 hp (302 kW; 411 PS) at 4200 rpm and maximum torque of 550 N⋅m (406 lb⋅ft; 56 kg⋅m) at 4200 rpm. It can accelerate from 0 to 100 km/h (0 to 62 mph) in 4.4 seconds and reaches a top speed of 193 km/h (120 mph). Over 9,000 kilometres (5,600 mi) of racing, Fuertes and Vallejo finished the rally in a 32nd place on their very first Dakar Rally. They were also 4th in the T1.3 category (petrol vehicles with 2WD).
